

36001–36100 

|-bgcolor=#E9E9E9
| 36001 ||  || — || July 14, 1999 || Socorro || LINEAR || GEF || align=right | 3.8 km || 
|-id=002 bgcolor=#E9E9E9
| 36002 ||  || — || July 14, 1999 || Socorro || LINEAR || HNS || align=right | 3.3 km || 
|-id=003 bgcolor=#fefefe
| 36003 ||  || — || July 14, 1999 || Socorro || LINEAR || NYS || align=right | 3.0 km || 
|-id=004 bgcolor=#fefefe
| 36004 ||  || — || July 14, 1999 || Socorro || LINEAR || — || align=right | 2.1 km || 
|-id=005 bgcolor=#E9E9E9
| 36005 ||  || — || July 14, 1999 || Socorro || LINEAR || GEF || align=right | 3.7 km || 
|-id=006 bgcolor=#E9E9E9
| 36006 ||  || — || July 14, 1999 || Socorro || LINEAR || — || align=right | 3.0 km || 
|-id=007 bgcolor=#fefefe
| 36007 ||  || — || July 14, 1999 || Socorro || LINEAR || NYS || align=right | 2.0 km || 
|-id=008 bgcolor=#E9E9E9
| 36008 ||  || — || July 14, 1999 || Socorro || LINEAR || — || align=right | 3.6 km || 
|-id=009 bgcolor=#d6d6d6
| 36009 ||  || — || July 14, 1999 || Socorro || LINEAR || URS || align=right | 9.6 km || 
|-id=010 bgcolor=#d6d6d6
| 36010 ||  || — || July 14, 1999 || Socorro || LINEAR || EOS || align=right | 6.7 km || 
|-id=011 bgcolor=#E9E9E9
| 36011 ||  || — || July 14, 1999 || Socorro || LINEAR || EUN || align=right | 3.7 km || 
|-id=012 bgcolor=#d6d6d6
| 36012 ||  || — || July 14, 1999 || Socorro || LINEAR || — || align=right | 9.9 km || 
|-id=013 bgcolor=#E9E9E9
| 36013 ||  || — || July 14, 1999 || Socorro || LINEAR || — || align=right | 6.4 km || 
|-id=014 bgcolor=#E9E9E9
| 36014 ||  || — || July 14, 1999 || Socorro || LINEAR || — || align=right | 3.9 km || 
|-id=015 bgcolor=#E9E9E9
| 36015 ||  || — || July 14, 1999 || Socorro || LINEAR || GEF || align=right | 3.0 km || 
|-id=016 bgcolor=#E9E9E9
| 36016 ||  || — || July 14, 1999 || Socorro || LINEAR || — || align=right | 5.0 km || 
|-id=017 bgcolor=#FFC2E0
| 36017 ||  || — || July 14, 1999 || Socorro || LINEAR || AMO || align=right data-sort-value="0.52" | 520 m || 
|-id=018 bgcolor=#d6d6d6
| 36018 ||  || — || July 13, 1999 || Socorro || LINEAR || ALA || align=right | 13 km || 
|-id=019 bgcolor=#E9E9E9
| 36019 ||  || — || July 13, 1999 || Socorro || LINEAR || EUN || align=right | 5.0 km || 
|-id=020 bgcolor=#d6d6d6
| 36020 ||  || — || July 13, 1999 || Socorro || LINEAR || EOS || align=right | 4.3 km || 
|-id=021 bgcolor=#fefefe
| 36021 ||  || — || July 13, 1999 || Socorro || LINEAR || V || align=right | 3.3 km || 
|-id=022 bgcolor=#E9E9E9
| 36022 ||  || — || July 13, 1999 || Socorro || LINEAR || — || align=right | 4.5 km || 
|-id=023 bgcolor=#d6d6d6
| 36023 ||  || — || July 13, 1999 || Socorro || LINEAR || — || align=right | 10 km || 
|-id=024 bgcolor=#fefefe
| 36024 ||  || — || July 14, 1999 || Socorro || LINEAR || — || align=right | 2.3 km || 
|-id=025 bgcolor=#fefefe
| 36025 ||  || — || July 14, 1999 || Socorro || LINEAR || NYS || align=right | 1.9 km || 
|-id=026 bgcolor=#d6d6d6
| 36026 ||  || — || July 12, 1999 || Socorro || LINEAR || — || align=right | 15 km || 
|-id=027 bgcolor=#E9E9E9
| 36027 ||  || — || July 12, 1999 || Socorro || LINEAR || EUN || align=right | 4.4 km || 
|-id=028 bgcolor=#E9E9E9
| 36028 ||  || — || July 12, 1999 || Socorro || LINEAR || — || align=right | 4.2 km || 
|-id=029 bgcolor=#E9E9E9
| 36029 ||  || — || July 12, 1999 || Socorro || LINEAR || — || align=right | 4.8 km || 
|-id=030 bgcolor=#d6d6d6
| 36030 ||  || — || July 13, 1999 || Socorro || LINEAR || ALA || align=right | 14 km || 
|-id=031 bgcolor=#E9E9E9
| 36031 ||  || — || July 10, 1999 || Wise || Wise Obs. || — || align=right | 5.5 km || 
|-id=032 bgcolor=#E9E9E9
| 36032 || 1999 OC || — || July 16, 1999 || Višnjan Observatory || K. Korlević || — || align=right | 6.7 km || 
|-id=033 bgcolor=#d6d6d6
| 36033 Viseggi ||  ||  || July 19, 1999 || Monte Viseggi || Monte Viseggi Obs. || — || align=right | 5.9 km || 
|-id=034 bgcolor=#E9E9E9
| 36034 ||  || — || July 24, 1999 || Farra d'Isonzo || Farra d'Isonzo || — || align=right | 5.3 km || 
|-id=035 bgcolor=#E9E9E9
| 36035 Petrvok || 1999 PV ||  || August 6, 1999 || Kleť || J. Tichá, M. Tichý || — || align=right | 5.8 km || 
|-id=036 bgcolor=#d6d6d6
| 36036 Bonucci ||  ||  || August 8, 1999 || Saji || Saji Obs. || KOR || align=right | 3.7 km || 
|-id=037 bgcolor=#d6d6d6
| 36037 Linenschmidt ||  ||  || August 13, 1999 || Nacogdoches || W. D. Bruton, C. F. Stewart || — || align=right | 3.7 km || 
|-id=038 bgcolor=#d6d6d6
| 36038 ||  || — || August 13, 1999 || Kitt Peak || Spacewatch || — || align=right | 7.5 km || 
|-id=039 bgcolor=#d6d6d6
| 36039 Joandunham ||  ||  || August 13, 1999 || Reedy Creek || J. Broughton || — || align=right | 8.9 km || 
|-id=040 bgcolor=#d6d6d6
| 36040 ||  || — || August 13, 1999 || Kitt Peak || Spacewatch || — || align=right | 3.4 km || 
|-id=041 bgcolor=#d6d6d6
| 36041 || 1999 QU || — || August 17, 1999 || Kitt Peak || Spacewatch || — || align=right | 5.4 km || 
|-id=042 bgcolor=#d6d6d6
| 36042 ||  || — || August 21, 1999 || Kitt Peak || Spacewatch || THM || align=right | 9.2 km || 
|-id=043 bgcolor=#d6d6d6
| 36043 ||  || — || September 4, 1999 || Catalina || CSS || EOS || align=right | 7.1 km || 
|-id=044 bgcolor=#d6d6d6
| 36044 ||  || — || September 7, 1999 || Kitt Peak || Spacewatch || — || align=right | 4.1 km || 
|-id=045 bgcolor=#d6d6d6
| 36045 ||  || — || September 7, 1999 || Socorro || LINEAR || EOS || align=right | 6.1 km || 
|-id=046 bgcolor=#d6d6d6
| 36046 ||  || — || September 7, 1999 || Socorro || LINEAR || EOS || align=right | 5.5 km || 
|-id=047 bgcolor=#d6d6d6
| 36047 ||  || — || September 7, 1999 || Socorro || LINEAR || EOS || align=right | 4.9 km || 
|-id=048 bgcolor=#E9E9E9
| 36048 ||  || — || September 7, 1999 || Socorro || LINEAR || GEF || align=right | 3.7 km || 
|-id=049 bgcolor=#d6d6d6
| 36049 ||  || — || September 7, 1999 || Socorro || LINEAR || — || align=right | 7.4 km || 
|-id=050 bgcolor=#E9E9E9
| 36050 ||  || — || September 7, 1999 || Socorro || LINEAR || — || align=right | 6.4 km || 
|-id=051 bgcolor=#E9E9E9
| 36051 ||  || — || September 7, 1999 || Socorro || LINEAR || XIZ || align=right | 4.7 km || 
|-id=052 bgcolor=#d6d6d6
| 36052 ||  || — || September 7, 1999 || Socorro || LINEAR || — || align=right | 8.1 km || 
|-id=053 bgcolor=#d6d6d6
| 36053 ||  || — || September 7, 1999 || Socorro || LINEAR || — || align=right | 8.2 km || 
|-id=054 bgcolor=#d6d6d6
| 36054 ||  || — || September 7, 1999 || Socorro || LINEAR || — || align=right | 5.1 km || 
|-id=055 bgcolor=#d6d6d6
| 36055 ||  || — || September 5, 1999 || Ondřejov || L. Kotková || KOR || align=right | 3.8 km || 
|-id=056 bgcolor=#d6d6d6
| 36056 ||  || — || September 8, 1999 || Črni Vrh || H. Mikuž || KOR || align=right | 6.9 km || 
|-id=057 bgcolor=#E9E9E9
| 36057 ||  || — || September 10, 1999 || Saint-Michel-sur-Meurthe || L. Bernasconi || — || align=right | 5.8 km || 
|-id=058 bgcolor=#d6d6d6
| 36058 ||  || — || September 10, 1999 || Višnjan Observatory || K. Korlević || — || align=right | 8.8 km || 
|-id=059 bgcolor=#d6d6d6
| 36059 ||  || — || September 7, 1999 || Catalina || CSS || EOS || align=right | 6.3 km || 
|-id=060 bgcolor=#E9E9E9
| 36060 Babuška ||  ||  || September 14, 1999 || Ondřejov || P. Pravec, P. Kušnirák || — || align=right | 3.0 km || 
|-id=061 bgcolor=#d6d6d6
| 36061 Haldane ||  ||  || September 11, 1999 || Monte Agliale || M. M. M. Santangelo || — || align=right | 8.3 km || 
|-id=062 bgcolor=#d6d6d6
| 36062 ||  || — || September 7, 1999 || Socorro || LINEAR || — || align=right | 12 km || 
|-id=063 bgcolor=#E9E9E9
| 36063 ||  || — || September 7, 1999 || Socorro || LINEAR || HNS || align=right | 4.3 km || 
|-id=064 bgcolor=#fefefe
| 36064 ||  || — || September 7, 1999 || Socorro || LINEAR || — || align=right | 5.6 km || 
|-id=065 bgcolor=#d6d6d6
| 36065 ||  || — || September 7, 1999 || Socorro || LINEAR || — || align=right | 7.7 km || 
|-id=066 bgcolor=#d6d6d6
| 36066 ||  || — || September 7, 1999 || Socorro || LINEAR || — || align=right | 7.1 km || 
|-id=067 bgcolor=#d6d6d6
| 36067 ||  || — || September 7, 1999 || Socorro || LINEAR || HYG || align=right | 6.3 km || 
|-id=068 bgcolor=#E9E9E9
| 36068 ||  || — || September 7, 1999 || Socorro || LINEAR || NEM || align=right | 5.4 km || 
|-id=069 bgcolor=#d6d6d6
| 36069 ||  || — || September 7, 1999 || Socorro || LINEAR || — || align=right | 7.8 km || 
|-id=070 bgcolor=#d6d6d6
| 36070 ||  || — || September 7, 1999 || Socorro || LINEAR || — || align=right | 11 km || 
|-id=071 bgcolor=#E9E9E9
| 36071 ||  || — || September 7, 1999 || Kitt Peak || Spacewatch || — || align=right | 3.0 km || 
|-id=072 bgcolor=#d6d6d6
| 36072 ||  || — || September 7, 1999 || Socorro || LINEAR || — || align=right | 6.5 km || 
|-id=073 bgcolor=#E9E9E9
| 36073 ||  || — || September 7, 1999 || Socorro || LINEAR || — || align=right | 3.5 km || 
|-id=074 bgcolor=#E9E9E9
| 36074 ||  || — || September 7, 1999 || Socorro || LINEAR || — || align=right | 5.2 km || 
|-id=075 bgcolor=#d6d6d6
| 36075 ||  || — || September 7, 1999 || Socorro || LINEAR || — || align=right | 11 km || 
|-id=076 bgcolor=#d6d6d6
| 36076 ||  || — || September 7, 1999 || Socorro || LINEAR || — || align=right | 5.4 km || 
|-id=077 bgcolor=#d6d6d6
| 36077 ||  || — || September 7, 1999 || Socorro || LINEAR || THM || align=right | 8.0 km || 
|-id=078 bgcolor=#d6d6d6
| 36078 ||  || — || September 7, 1999 || Socorro || LINEAR || — || align=right | 6.2 km || 
|-id=079 bgcolor=#fefefe
| 36079 ||  || — || September 7, 1999 || Socorro || LINEAR || — || align=right | 3.1 km || 
|-id=080 bgcolor=#d6d6d6
| 36080 ||  || — || September 7, 1999 || Socorro || LINEAR || EOS || align=right | 4.9 km || 
|-id=081 bgcolor=#d6d6d6
| 36081 ||  || — || September 7, 1999 || Socorro || LINEAR || EOS || align=right | 8.4 km || 
|-id=082 bgcolor=#d6d6d6
| 36082 ||  || — || September 7, 1999 || Socorro || LINEAR || — || align=right | 8.4 km || 
|-id=083 bgcolor=#d6d6d6
| 36083 ||  || — || September 7, 1999 || Socorro || LINEAR || HYG || align=right | 9.0 km || 
|-id=084 bgcolor=#d6d6d6
| 36084 ||  || — || September 7, 1999 || Socorro || LINEAR || EOS || align=right | 6.1 km || 
|-id=085 bgcolor=#d6d6d6
| 36085 ||  || — || September 7, 1999 || Socorro || LINEAR || — || align=right | 7.0 km || 
|-id=086 bgcolor=#d6d6d6
| 36086 ||  || — || September 7, 1999 || Socorro || LINEAR || HYG || align=right | 10 km || 
|-id=087 bgcolor=#E9E9E9
| 36087 ||  || — || September 7, 1999 || Socorro || LINEAR || — || align=right | 6.7 km || 
|-id=088 bgcolor=#d6d6d6
| 36088 ||  || — || September 7, 1999 || Socorro || LINEAR || — || align=right | 5.0 km || 
|-id=089 bgcolor=#d6d6d6
| 36089 ||  || — || September 7, 1999 || Socorro || LINEAR || THM || align=right | 6.7 km || 
|-id=090 bgcolor=#d6d6d6
| 36090 ||  || — || September 8, 1999 || Socorro || LINEAR || EOS || align=right | 6.0 km || 
|-id=091 bgcolor=#d6d6d6
| 36091 ||  || — || September 8, 1999 || Socorro || LINEAR || EOS || align=right | 6.2 km || 
|-id=092 bgcolor=#d6d6d6
| 36092 ||  || — || September 8, 1999 || Socorro || LINEAR || EOS || align=right | 5.3 km || 
|-id=093 bgcolor=#d6d6d6
| 36093 ||  || — || September 8, 1999 || Socorro || LINEAR || — || align=right | 12 km || 
|-id=094 bgcolor=#d6d6d6
| 36094 ||  || — || September 8, 1999 || Socorro || LINEAR || EOS || align=right | 5.5 km || 
|-id=095 bgcolor=#d6d6d6
| 36095 ||  || — || September 8, 1999 || Socorro || LINEAR || — || align=right | 7.9 km || 
|-id=096 bgcolor=#d6d6d6
| 36096 ||  || — || September 8, 1999 || Socorro || LINEAR || — || align=right | 11 km || 
|-id=097 bgcolor=#fefefe
| 36097 ||  || — || September 9, 1999 || Socorro || LINEAR || — || align=right | 4.3 km || 
|-id=098 bgcolor=#d6d6d6
| 36098 ||  || — || September 9, 1999 || Socorro || LINEAR || EOS || align=right | 6.5 km || 
|-id=099 bgcolor=#E9E9E9
| 36099 ||  || — || September 9, 1999 || Socorro || LINEAR || EUN || align=right | 3.6 km || 
|-id=100 bgcolor=#d6d6d6
| 36100 ||  || — || September 9, 1999 || Socorro || LINEAR || — || align=right | 7.2 km || 
|}

36101–36200 

|-bgcolor=#d6d6d6
| 36101 ||  || — || September 9, 1999 || Socorro || LINEAR || — || align=right | 7.8 km || 
|-id=102 bgcolor=#E9E9E9
| 36102 ||  || — || September 9, 1999 || Socorro || LINEAR || — || align=right | 4.4 km || 
|-id=103 bgcolor=#d6d6d6
| 36103 ||  || — || September 9, 1999 || Socorro || LINEAR || EOSslow || align=right | 5.8 km || 
|-id=104 bgcolor=#E9E9E9
| 36104 ||  || — || September 9, 1999 || Socorro || LINEAR || EUN || align=right | 4.3 km || 
|-id=105 bgcolor=#E9E9E9
| 36105 ||  || — || September 9, 1999 || Socorro || LINEAR || — || align=right | 4.4 km || 
|-id=106 bgcolor=#E9E9E9
| 36106 ||  || — || September 9, 1999 || Socorro || LINEAR || EUN || align=right | 4.4 km || 
|-id=107 bgcolor=#d6d6d6
| 36107 ||  || — || September 9, 1999 || Socorro || LINEAR || — || align=right | 8.3 km || 
|-id=108 bgcolor=#fefefe
| 36108 ||  || — || September 9, 1999 || Socorro || LINEAR || — || align=right | 2.9 km || 
|-id=109 bgcolor=#d6d6d6
| 36109 ||  || — || September 9, 1999 || Socorro || LINEAR || HYG || align=right | 7.4 km || 
|-id=110 bgcolor=#d6d6d6
| 36110 ||  || — || September 9, 1999 || Socorro || LINEAR || — || align=right | 5.2 km || 
|-id=111 bgcolor=#fefefe
| 36111 ||  || — || September 9, 1999 || Socorro || LINEAR || — || align=right | 2.8 km || 
|-id=112 bgcolor=#d6d6d6
| 36112 ||  || — || September 9, 1999 || Socorro || LINEAR || ALA || align=right | 13 km || 
|-id=113 bgcolor=#d6d6d6
| 36113 ||  || — || September 9, 1999 || Socorro || LINEAR || THM || align=right | 8.2 km || 
|-id=114 bgcolor=#fefefe
| 36114 ||  || — || September 9, 1999 || Socorro || LINEAR || NYS || align=right | 2.5 km || 
|-id=115 bgcolor=#E9E9E9
| 36115 ||  || — || September 9, 1999 || Socorro || LINEAR || GEF || align=right | 4.4 km || 
|-id=116 bgcolor=#d6d6d6
| 36116 ||  || — || September 9, 1999 || Socorro || LINEAR || — || align=right | 8.2 km || 
|-id=117 bgcolor=#d6d6d6
| 36117 ||  || — || September 9, 1999 || Socorro || LINEAR || EOS || align=right | 7.5 km || 
|-id=118 bgcolor=#E9E9E9
| 36118 ||  || — || September 9, 1999 || Socorro || LINEAR || — || align=right | 5.0 km || 
|-id=119 bgcolor=#fefefe
| 36119 ||  || — || September 9, 1999 || Socorro || LINEAR || — || align=right | 2.3 km || 
|-id=120 bgcolor=#d6d6d6
| 36120 ||  || — || September 9, 1999 || Socorro || LINEAR || EOS || align=right | 5.3 km || 
|-id=121 bgcolor=#d6d6d6
| 36121 ||  || — || September 9, 1999 || Socorro || LINEAR || — || align=right | 6.8 km || 
|-id=122 bgcolor=#E9E9E9
| 36122 ||  || — || September 9, 1999 || Socorro || LINEAR || EUN || align=right | 3.7 km || 
|-id=123 bgcolor=#d6d6d6
| 36123 ||  || — || September 9, 1999 || Socorro || LINEAR || EOS || align=right | 6.3 km || 
|-id=124 bgcolor=#E9E9E9
| 36124 ||  || — || September 9, 1999 || Socorro || LINEAR || GEF || align=right | 4.4 km || 
|-id=125 bgcolor=#d6d6d6
| 36125 ||  || — || September 9, 1999 || Socorro || LINEAR || EOS || align=right | 5.7 km || 
|-id=126 bgcolor=#E9E9E9
| 36126 ||  || — || September 9, 1999 || Socorro || LINEAR || — || align=right | 3.6 km || 
|-id=127 bgcolor=#d6d6d6
| 36127 ||  || — || September 9, 1999 || Socorro || LINEAR || — || align=right | 5.9 km || 
|-id=128 bgcolor=#d6d6d6
| 36128 ||  || — || September 9, 1999 || Socorro || LINEAR || KOR || align=right | 5.0 km || 
|-id=129 bgcolor=#d6d6d6
| 36129 ||  || — || September 9, 1999 || Socorro || LINEAR || KOR || align=right | 5.1 km || 
|-id=130 bgcolor=#d6d6d6
| 36130 ||  || — || September 9, 1999 || Socorro || LINEAR || — || align=right | 6.9 km || 
|-id=131 bgcolor=#d6d6d6
| 36131 ||  || — || September 9, 1999 || Socorro || LINEAR || — || align=right | 5.2 km || 
|-id=132 bgcolor=#d6d6d6
| 36132 ||  || — || September 9, 1999 || Socorro || LINEAR || — || align=right | 7.2 km || 
|-id=133 bgcolor=#d6d6d6
| 36133 ||  || — || September 9, 1999 || Socorro || LINEAR || KOR || align=right | 4.5 km || 
|-id=134 bgcolor=#E9E9E9
| 36134 ||  || — || September 9, 1999 || Socorro || LINEAR || — || align=right | 4.2 km || 
|-id=135 bgcolor=#E9E9E9
| 36135 ||  || — || September 9, 1999 || Socorro || LINEAR || — || align=right | 3.1 km || 
|-id=136 bgcolor=#d6d6d6
| 36136 ||  || — || September 9, 1999 || Socorro || LINEAR || — || align=right | 10 km || 
|-id=137 bgcolor=#d6d6d6
| 36137 ||  || — || September 9, 1999 || Socorro || LINEAR || — || align=right | 9.2 km || 
|-id=138 bgcolor=#d6d6d6
| 36138 ||  || — || September 9, 1999 || Socorro || LINEAR || — || align=right | 10 km || 
|-id=139 bgcolor=#d6d6d6
| 36139 ||  || — || September 9, 1999 || Socorro || LINEAR || — || align=right | 9.0 km || 
|-id=140 bgcolor=#d6d6d6
| 36140 ||  || — || September 9, 1999 || Socorro || LINEAR || 2:1J || align=right | 6.9 km || 
|-id=141 bgcolor=#d6d6d6
| 36141 ||  || — || September 9, 1999 || Socorro || LINEAR || THM || align=right | 6.4 km || 
|-id=142 bgcolor=#d6d6d6
| 36142 ||  || — || September 9, 1999 || Socorro || LINEAR || — || align=right | 9.6 km || 
|-id=143 bgcolor=#d6d6d6
| 36143 ||  || — || September 9, 1999 || Socorro || LINEAR || — || align=right | 7.7 km || 
|-id=144 bgcolor=#d6d6d6
| 36144 ||  || — || September 9, 1999 || Socorro || LINEAR || — || align=right | 8.2 km || 
|-id=145 bgcolor=#d6d6d6
| 36145 ||  || — || September 9, 1999 || Socorro || LINEAR || — || align=right | 12 km || 
|-id=146 bgcolor=#d6d6d6
| 36146 ||  || — || September 9, 1999 || Socorro || LINEAR || — || align=right | 11 km || 
|-id=147 bgcolor=#d6d6d6
| 36147 ||  || — || September 9, 1999 || Socorro || LINEAR || THM || align=right | 10 km || 
|-id=148 bgcolor=#d6d6d6
| 36148 ||  || — || September 13, 1999 || Socorro || LINEAR || — || align=right | 6.3 km || 
|-id=149 bgcolor=#d6d6d6
| 36149 ||  || — || September 13, 1999 || Socorro || LINEAR || — || align=right | 5.8 km || 
|-id=150 bgcolor=#d6d6d6
| 36150 ||  || — || September 13, 1999 || Socorro || LINEAR || — || align=right | 12 km || 
|-id=151 bgcolor=#d6d6d6
| 36151 ||  || — || September 13, 1999 || Socorro || LINEAR || EOS || align=right | 11 km || 
|-id=152 bgcolor=#d6d6d6
| 36152 ||  || — || September 8, 1999 || Socorro || LINEAR || EOS || align=right | 6.7 km || 
|-id=153 bgcolor=#E9E9E9
| 36153 ||  || — || September 8, 1999 || Socorro || LINEAR || MIT || align=right | 8.7 km || 
|-id=154 bgcolor=#d6d6d6
| 36154 ||  || — || September 8, 1999 || Socorro || LINEAR || — || align=right | 10 km || 
|-id=155 bgcolor=#d6d6d6
| 36155 ||  || — || September 8, 1999 || Socorro || LINEAR || — || align=right | 12 km || 
|-id=156 bgcolor=#d6d6d6
| 36156 ||  || — || September 8, 1999 || Socorro || LINEAR || — || align=right | 18 km || 
|-id=157 bgcolor=#d6d6d6
| 36157 ||  || — || September 8, 1999 || Socorro || LINEAR || EOS || align=right | 7.3 km || 
|-id=158 bgcolor=#d6d6d6
| 36158 ||  || — || September 8, 1999 || Socorro || LINEAR || — || align=right | 10 km || 
|-id=159 bgcolor=#E9E9E9
| 36159 ||  || — || September 4, 1999 || Catalina || CSS || — || align=right | 5.1 km || 
|-id=160 bgcolor=#d6d6d6
| 36160 ||  || — || September 5, 1999 || Anderson Mesa || LONEOS || EOS || align=right | 6.2 km || 
|-id=161 bgcolor=#d6d6d6
| 36161 ||  || — || September 4, 1999 || Anderson Mesa || LONEOS || — || align=right | 9.5 km || 
|-id=162 bgcolor=#d6d6d6
| 36162 ||  || — || September 6, 1999 || Catalina || CSS || — || align=right | 8.3 km || 
|-id=163 bgcolor=#d6d6d6
| 36163 ||  || — || September 7, 1999 || Catalina || CSS || ALA || align=right | 11 km || 
|-id=164 bgcolor=#E9E9E9
| 36164 ||  || — || September 5, 1999 || Catalina || CSS || — || align=right | 7.7 km || 
|-id=165 bgcolor=#E9E9E9
| 36165 ||  || — || September 5, 1999 || Catalina || CSS || — || align=right | 5.7 km || 
|-id=166 bgcolor=#d6d6d6
| 36166 ||  || — || September 5, 1999 || Kitt Peak || Spacewatch || — || align=right | 6.0 km || 
|-id=167 bgcolor=#d6d6d6
| 36167 ||  || — || September 8, 1999 || Catalina || CSS || — || align=right | 9.7 km || 
|-id=168 bgcolor=#d6d6d6
| 36168 ||  || — || September 8, 1999 || Catalina || CSS || EOS || align=right | 6.7 km || 
|-id=169 bgcolor=#d6d6d6
| 36169 Grosseteste ||  ||  || September 11, 1999 || Anderson Mesa || LONEOS || — || align=right | 9.3 km || 
|-id=170 bgcolor=#d6d6d6
| 36170 ||  || — || September 12, 1999 || Anderson Mesa || LONEOS || EOS || align=right | 6.4 km || 
|-id=171 bgcolor=#d6d6d6
| 36171 ||  || — || September 4, 1999 || Anderson Mesa || LONEOS || — || align=right | 7.9 km || 
|-id=172 bgcolor=#d6d6d6
| 36172 ||  || — || September 4, 1999 || Kitt Peak || Spacewatch || — || align=right | 6.5 km || 
|-id=173 bgcolor=#E9E9E9
| 36173 ||  || — || September 17, 1999 || Višnjan Observatory || K. Korlević || — || align=right | 6.0 km || 
|-id=174 bgcolor=#d6d6d6
| 36174 ||  || — || September 23, 1999 || Ondřejov || M. Wolf, L. Kotková || — || align=right | 9.4 km || 
|-id=175 bgcolor=#d6d6d6
| 36175 ||  || — || September 30, 1999 || Socorro || LINEAR || — || align=right | 9.1 km || 
|-id=176 bgcolor=#fefefe
| 36176 ||  || — || September 29, 1999 || Višnjan Observatory || K. Korlević || — || align=right | 2.6 km || 
|-id=177 bgcolor=#d6d6d6
| 36177 Tonysharon ||  ||  || September 30, 1999 || Socorro || LINEAR || — || align=right | 7.6 km || 
|-id=178 bgcolor=#d6d6d6
| 36178 ||  || — || September 29, 1999 || Catalina || CSS || — || align=right | 9.3 km || 
|-id=179 bgcolor=#d6d6d6
| 36179 ||  || — || September 30, 1999 || Socorro || LINEAR || — || align=right | 7.7 km || 
|-id=180 bgcolor=#d6d6d6
| 36180 ||  || — || September 30, 1999 || Socorro || LINEAR || — || align=right | 11 km || 
|-id=181 bgcolor=#d6d6d6
| 36181 ||  || — || October 8, 1999 || Višnjan Observatory || K. Korlević, M. Jurić || — || align=right | 15 km || 
|-id=182 bgcolor=#d6d6d6
| 36182 Montigiani ||  ||  || October 10, 1999 || Monte Agliale || M. M. M. Santangelo || 3:2 || align=right | 12 km || 
|-id=183 bgcolor=#FFC2E0
| 36183 ||  || — || October 13, 1999 || Socorro || LINEAR || AMO +1km || align=right | 2.3 km || 
|-id=184 bgcolor=#fefefe
| 36184 Pavelbožek ||  ||  || October 14, 1999 || Ondřejov || L. Kotková || MAS || align=right | 1.4 km || 
|-id=185 bgcolor=#E9E9E9
| 36185 ||  || — || October 3, 1999 || Socorro || LINEAR || DOR || align=right | 10 km || 
|-id=186 bgcolor=#d6d6d6
| 36186 ||  || — || October 4, 1999 || Socorro || LINEAR || — || align=right | 12 km || 
|-id=187 bgcolor=#d6d6d6
| 36187 Travisbarman ||  ||  || October 13, 1999 || Anderson Mesa || LONEOS || — || align=right | 13 km || 
|-id=188 bgcolor=#E9E9E9
| 36188 ||  || — || October 13, 1999 || Anderson Mesa || LONEOS || — || align=right | 7.0 km || 
|-id=189 bgcolor=#E9E9E9
| 36189 ||  || — || October 1, 1999 || Catalina || CSS || — || align=right | 7.9 km || 
|-id=190 bgcolor=#E9E9E9
| 36190 ||  || — || October 5, 1999 || Catalina || CSS || ADE || align=right | 8.6 km || 
|-id=191 bgcolor=#d6d6d6
| 36191 ||  || — || October 11, 1999 || Kitt Peak || Spacewatch || — || align=right | 6.1 km || 
|-id=192 bgcolor=#E9E9E9
| 36192 ||  || — || October 2, 1999 || Socorro || LINEAR || CLO || align=right | 7.1 km || 
|-id=193 bgcolor=#d6d6d6
| 36193 ||  || — || October 2, 1999 || Socorro || LINEAR || — || align=right | 7.7 km || 
|-id=194 bgcolor=#d6d6d6
| 36194 ||  || — || October 2, 1999 || Socorro || LINEAR || — || align=right | 4.5 km || 
|-id=195 bgcolor=#d6d6d6
| 36195 ||  || — || October 2, 1999 || Socorro || LINEAR || — || align=right | 4.7 km || 
|-id=196 bgcolor=#d6d6d6
| 36196 ||  || — || October 2, 1999 || Socorro || LINEAR || EOS || align=right | 7.2 km || 
|-id=197 bgcolor=#E9E9E9
| 36197 ||  || — || October 2, 1999 || Socorro || LINEAR || CLO || align=right | 8.3 km || 
|-id=198 bgcolor=#d6d6d6
| 36198 ||  || — || October 2, 1999 || Socorro || LINEAR || EOS || align=right | 10 km || 
|-id=199 bgcolor=#E9E9E9
| 36199 ||  || — || October 2, 1999 || Socorro || LINEAR || — || align=right | 6.4 km || 
|-id=200 bgcolor=#d6d6d6
| 36200 ||  || — || October 2, 1999 || Socorro || LINEAR || — || align=right | 6.2 km || 
|}

36201–36300 

|-bgcolor=#d6d6d6
| 36201 ||  || — || October 2, 1999 || Socorro || LINEAR || — || align=right | 6.4 km || 
|-id=202 bgcolor=#d6d6d6
| 36202 ||  || — || October 2, 1999 || Socorro || LINEAR || EOS || align=right | 6.9 km || 
|-id=203 bgcolor=#d6d6d6
| 36203 ||  || — || October 2, 1999 || Socorro || LINEAR || — || align=right | 11 km || 
|-id=204 bgcolor=#d6d6d6
| 36204 ||  || — || October 2, 1999 || Socorro || LINEAR || ALA || align=right | 14 km || 
|-id=205 bgcolor=#d6d6d6
| 36205 ||  || — || October 2, 1999 || Socorro || LINEAR || — || align=right | 15 km || 
|-id=206 bgcolor=#d6d6d6
| 36206 ||  || — || October 4, 1999 || Socorro || LINEAR || — || align=right | 4.8 km || 
|-id=207 bgcolor=#E9E9E9
| 36207 ||  || — || October 4, 1999 || Socorro || LINEAR || — || align=right | 7.0 km || 
|-id=208 bgcolor=#d6d6d6
| 36208 ||  || — || October 4, 1999 || Socorro || LINEAR || — || align=right | 12 km || 
|-id=209 bgcolor=#d6d6d6
| 36209 ||  || — || October 6, 1999 || Socorro || LINEAR || — || align=right | 5.2 km || 
|-id=210 bgcolor=#d6d6d6
| 36210 ||  || — || October 7, 1999 || Socorro || LINEAR || — || align=right | 11 km || 
|-id=211 bgcolor=#d6d6d6
| 36211 ||  || — || October 7, 1999 || Socorro || LINEAR || — || align=right | 9.0 km || 
|-id=212 bgcolor=#d6d6d6
| 36212 ||  || — || October 7, 1999 || Socorro || LINEAR || HYG || align=right | 10 km || 
|-id=213 bgcolor=#d6d6d6
| 36213 Robertotisgreen ||  ||  || October 9, 1999 || Socorro || LINEAR || — || align=right | 8.0 km || 
|-id=214 bgcolor=#d6d6d6
| 36214 ||  || — || October 13, 1999 || Socorro || LINEAR || — || align=right | 8.1 km || 
|-id=215 bgcolor=#d6d6d6
| 36215 ||  || — || October 15, 1999 || Socorro || LINEAR || — || align=right | 8.4 km || 
|-id=216 bgcolor=#d6d6d6
| 36216 ||  || — || October 15, 1999 || Socorro || LINEAR || THM || align=right | 10 km || 
|-id=217 bgcolor=#d6d6d6
| 36217 ||  || — || October 15, 1999 || Socorro || LINEAR || HYG || align=right | 9.4 km || 
|-id=218 bgcolor=#E9E9E9
| 36218 ||  || — || October 1, 1999 || Catalina || CSS || RAF || align=right | 4.1 km || 
|-id=219 bgcolor=#d6d6d6
| 36219 ||  || — || October 2, 1999 || Socorro || LINEAR || HYG || align=right | 11 km || 
|-id=220 bgcolor=#d6d6d6
| 36220 ||  || — || October 5, 1999 || Catalina || CSS || — || align=right | 9.6 km || 
|-id=221 bgcolor=#d6d6d6
| 36221 ||  || — || October 7, 1999 || Catalina || CSS || HYG || align=right | 9.6 km || 
|-id=222 bgcolor=#d6d6d6
| 36222 ||  || — || October 8, 1999 || Catalina || CSS || HYG || align=right | 11 km || 
|-id=223 bgcolor=#E9E9E9
| 36223 ||  || — || October 3, 1999 || Socorro || LINEAR || EUN || align=right | 3.6 km || 
|-id=224 bgcolor=#d6d6d6
| 36224 ||  || — || October 3, 1999 || Socorro || LINEAR || — || align=right | 8.8 km || 
|-id=225 bgcolor=#d6d6d6
| 36225 ||  || — || October 3, 1999 || Socorro || LINEAR || — || align=right | 7.5 km || 
|-id=226 bgcolor=#d6d6d6
| 36226 Mackerras ||  ||  || October 31, 1999 || Ondřejov || L. Kotková || HYG || align=right | 9.4 km || 
|-id=227 bgcolor=#d6d6d6
| 36227 ||  || — || October 29, 1999 || Catalina || CSS || slow? || align=right | 15 km || 
|-id=228 bgcolor=#d6d6d6
| 36228 ||  || — || October 29, 1999 || Catalina || CSS || HYG || align=right | 9.0 km || 
|-id=229 bgcolor=#d6d6d6
| 36229 ||  || — || October 29, 1999 || Catalina || CSS || — || align=right | 7.5 km || 
|-id=230 bgcolor=#d6d6d6
| 36230 ||  || — || October 29, 1999 || Catalina || CSS || EOS || align=right | 9.8 km || 
|-id=231 bgcolor=#d6d6d6
| 36231 ||  || — || October 29, 1999 || Catalina || CSS || — || align=right | 11 km || 
|-id=232 bgcolor=#d6d6d6
| 36232 ||  || — || October 30, 1999 || Catalina || CSS || HYG || align=right | 8.5 km || 
|-id=233 bgcolor=#d6d6d6
| 36233 ||  || — || October 30, 1999 || Kitt Peak || Spacewatch || — || align=right | 7.4 km || 
|-id=234 bgcolor=#d6d6d6
| 36234 ||  || — || October 20, 1999 || Socorro || LINEAR || — || align=right | 7.8 km || 
|-id=235 bgcolor=#E9E9E9
| 36235 Sergebaudo || 1999 VJ ||  || November 1, 1999 || Ondřejov || L. Kotková || MAR || align=right | 3.4 km || 
|-id=236 bgcolor=#FFC2E0
| 36236 || 1999 VV || — || November 1, 1999 || Socorro || LINEAR || APO +1km || align=right | 2.4 km || 
|-id=237 bgcolor=#d6d6d6
| 36237 ||  || — || November 10, 1999 || Fountain Hills || C. W. Juels || — || align=right | 20 km || 
|-id=238 bgcolor=#d6d6d6
| 36238 ||  || — || November 8, 1999 || Višnjan Observatory || K. Korlević || — || align=right | 9.5 km || 
|-id=239 bgcolor=#d6d6d6
| 36239 ||  || — || November 3, 1999 || Socorro || LINEAR || — || align=right | 9.2 km || 
|-id=240 bgcolor=#E9E9E9
| 36240 ||  || — || November 4, 1999 || Catalina || CSS || — || align=right | 9.4 km || 
|-id=241 bgcolor=#d6d6d6
| 36241 ||  || — || November 3, 1999 || Socorro || LINEAR || HYG || align=right | 9.1 km || 
|-id=242 bgcolor=#d6d6d6
| 36242 ||  || — || November 5, 1999 || Xinglong || SCAP || — || align=right | 10 km || 
|-id=243 bgcolor=#d6d6d6
| 36243 ||  || — || November 5, 1999 || Socorro || LINEAR || — || align=right | 7.0 km || 
|-id=244 bgcolor=#fefefe
| 36244 ||  || — || November 5, 1999 || Catalina || CSS || PHO || align=right | 4.2 km || 
|-id=245 bgcolor=#E9E9E9
| 36245 ||  || — || November 5, 1999 || Socorro || LINEAR || — || align=right | 3.4 km || 
|-id=246 bgcolor=#fefefe
| 36246 ||  || — || November 9, 1999 || Socorro || LINEAR || — || align=right | 2.1 km || 
|-id=247 bgcolor=#E9E9E9
| 36247 ||  || — || November 12, 1999 || Socorro || LINEAR || MAR || align=right | 3.9 km || 
|-id=248 bgcolor=#d6d6d6
| 36248 ||  || — || November 2, 1999 || Catalina || CSS || — || align=right | 10 km || 
|-id=249 bgcolor=#d6d6d6
| 36249 ||  || — || November 6, 1999 || Socorro || LINEAR || 7:4 || align=right | 11 km || 
|-id=250 bgcolor=#d6d6d6
| 36250 ||  || — || November 6, 1999 || Socorro || LINEAR || — || align=right | 11 km || 
|-id=251 bgcolor=#d6d6d6
| 36251 ||  || — || November 6, 1999 || Socorro || LINEAR || KOR || align=right | 5.5 km || 
|-id=252 bgcolor=#E9E9E9
| 36252 ||  || — || November 15, 1999 || Socorro || LINEAR || HOF || align=right | 6.9 km || 
|-id=253 bgcolor=#d6d6d6
| 36253 ||  || — || December 6, 1999 || Catalina || CSS || — || align=right | 11 km || 
|-id=254 bgcolor=#d6d6d6
| 36254 ||  || — || December 2, 1999 || Socorro || LINEAR || — || align=right | 8.4 km || 
|-id=255 bgcolor=#E9E9E9
| 36255 ||  || — || December 2, 1999 || Socorro || LINEAR || — || align=right | 3.4 km || 
|-id=256 bgcolor=#d6d6d6
| 36256 ||  || — || December 3, 1999 || Socorro || LINEAR || 629 || align=right | 10 km || 
|-id=257 bgcolor=#d6d6d6
| 36257 ||  || — || December 5, 1999 || Socorro || LINEAR || THM || align=right | 5.5 km || 
|-id=258 bgcolor=#fefefe
| 36258 ||  || — || December 7, 1999 || Socorro || LINEAR || NYS || align=right | 2.2 km || 
|-id=259 bgcolor=#C2FFFF
| 36259 ||  || — || December 7, 1999 || Socorro || LINEAR || L4 || align=right | 25 km || 
|-id=260 bgcolor=#E9E9E9
| 36260 ||  || — || December 7, 1999 || Socorro || LINEAR || MIT || align=right | 10 km || 
|-id=261 bgcolor=#d6d6d6
| 36261 ||  || — || December 5, 1999 || Catalina || CSS || — || align=right | 5.8 km || 
|-id=262 bgcolor=#d6d6d6
| 36262 ||  || — || December 5, 1999 || Catalina || CSS || — || align=right | 13 km || 
|-id=263 bgcolor=#E9E9E9
| 36263 ||  || — || December 7, 1999 || Kitt Peak || Spacewatch || RAF || align=right | 3.5 km || 
|-id=264 bgcolor=#d6d6d6
| 36264 Kojimatsumoto ||  ||  || December 13, 1999 || Anderson Mesa || LONEOS || EOS || align=right | 7.1 km || 
|-id=265 bgcolor=#C2FFFF
| 36265 ||  || — || December 8, 1999 || Socorro || LINEAR || L4 || align=right | 22 km || 
|-id=266 bgcolor=#fefefe
| 36266 ||  || — || December 12, 1999 || Socorro || LINEAR || — || align=right | 2.9 km || 
|-id=267 bgcolor=#C2FFFF
| 36267 ||  || — || December 13, 1999 || Socorro || LINEAR || L4 || align=right | 39 km || 
|-id=268 bgcolor=#C2FFFF
| 36268 ||  || — || December 14, 1999 || Socorro || LINEAR || L4 || align=right | 20 km || 
|-id=269 bgcolor=#C2FFFF
| 36269 ||  || — || December 14, 1999 || Socorro || LINEAR || L4 || align=right | 26 km || 
|-id=270 bgcolor=#C2FFFF
| 36270 ||  || — || December 6, 1999 || Socorro || LINEAR || L4 || align=right | 23 km || 
|-id=271 bgcolor=#C2FFFF
| 36271 ||  || — || January 3, 2000 || Socorro || LINEAR || L4 || align=right | 22 km || 
|-id=272 bgcolor=#d6d6d6
| 36272 ||  || — || January 4, 2000 || Socorro || LINEAR || — || align=right | 12 km || 
|-id=273 bgcolor=#E9E9E9
| 36273 ||  || — || January 5, 2000 || Socorro || LINEAR || PAL || align=right | 7.6 km || 
|-id=274 bgcolor=#d6d6d6
| 36274 ||  || — || January 5, 2000 || Socorro || LINEAR || 3:2 || align=right | 18 km || 
|-id=275 bgcolor=#d6d6d6
| 36275 ||  || — || January 5, 2000 || Socorro || LINEAR || EOS || align=right | 6.6 km || 
|-id=276 bgcolor=#E9E9E9
| 36276 ||  || — || January 8, 2000 || Socorro || LINEAR || — || align=right | 2.6 km || 
|-id=277 bgcolor=#E9E9E9
| 36277 ||  || — || January 7, 2000 || Socorro || LINEAR || — || align=right | 4.1 km || 
|-id=278 bgcolor=#d6d6d6
| 36278 ||  || — || January 3, 2000 || Socorro || LINEAR || TIR || align=right | 5.9 km || 
|-id=279 bgcolor=#C2FFFF
| 36279 ||  || — || January 27, 2000 || Socorro || LINEAR || L4 || align=right | 31 km || 
|-id=280 bgcolor=#E9E9E9
| 36280 ||  || — || February 1, 2000 || Ondřejov || P. Kušnirák || — || align=right | 5.4 km || 
|-id=281 bgcolor=#d6d6d6
| 36281 ||  || — || February 4, 2000 || Socorro || LINEAR || KOR || align=right | 3.5 km || 
|-id=282 bgcolor=#FA8072
| 36282 ||  || — || February 8, 2000 || Kitt Peak || Spacewatch || — || align=right | 2.6 km || 
|-id=283 bgcolor=#fefefe
| 36283 ||  || — || February 26, 2000 || Socorro || LINEAR || H || align=right | 1.6 km || 
|-id=284 bgcolor=#FFC2E0
| 36284 ||  || — || February 27, 2000 || Socorro || LINEAR || APO +1km || align=right | 3.7 km || 
|-id=285 bgcolor=#fefefe
| 36285 ||  || — || February 29, 2000 || Socorro || LINEAR || FLO || align=right | 1.9 km || 
|-id=286 bgcolor=#fefefe
| 36286 ||  || — || March 5, 2000 || Višnjan Observatory || K. Korlević || CLA || align=right | 4.2 km || 
|-id=287 bgcolor=#fefefe
| 36287 ||  || — || March 9, 2000 || Socorro || LINEAR || MAS || align=right | 2.3 km || 
|-id=288 bgcolor=#fefefe
| 36288 ||  || — || March 5, 2000 || Socorro || LINEAR || V || align=right | 1.7 km || 
|-id=289 bgcolor=#d6d6d6
| 36289 ||  || — || March 28, 2000 || Socorro || LINEAR || URS || align=right | 21 km || 
|-id=290 bgcolor=#E9E9E9
| 36290 ||  || — || March 27, 2000 || Anderson Mesa || LONEOS || — || align=right | 3.5 km || 
|-id=291 bgcolor=#E9E9E9
| 36291 ||  || — || April 7, 2000 || Socorro || LINEAR || — || align=right | 5.2 km || 
|-id=292 bgcolor=#fefefe
| 36292 ||  || — || April 11, 2000 || Fountain Hills || C. W. Juels || FLO || align=right | 2.3 km || 
|-id=293 bgcolor=#fefefe
| 36293 ||  || — || April 7, 2000 || Kitt Peak || Spacewatch || — || align=right | 2.8 km || 
|-id=294 bgcolor=#fefefe
| 36294 ||  || — || April 6, 2000 || Socorro || LINEAR || — || align=right | 5.5 km || 
|-id=295 bgcolor=#fefefe
| 36295 ||  || — || April 28, 2000 || Socorro || LINEAR || — || align=right | 2.0 km || 
|-id=296 bgcolor=#fefefe
| 36296 ||  || — || April 29, 2000 || Socorro || LINEAR || NYS || align=right | 2.4 km || 
|-id=297 bgcolor=#d6d6d6
| 36297 ||  || — || May 5, 2000 || Prescott || P. G. Comba || — || align=right | 8.2 km || 
|-id=298 bgcolor=#fefefe
| 36298 ||  || — || May 3, 2000 || Socorro || LINEAR || H || align=right | 2.1 km || 
|-id=299 bgcolor=#fefefe
| 36299 ||  || — || May 6, 2000 || Socorro || LINEAR || H || align=right | 1.5 km || 
|-id=300 bgcolor=#E9E9E9
| 36300 ||  || — || May 3, 2000 || Socorro || LINEAR || — || align=right | 3.1 km || 
|}

36301–36400 

|-bgcolor=#fefefe
| 36301 ||  || — || May 6, 2000 || Socorro || LINEAR || NYS || align=right | 2.2 km || 
|-id=302 bgcolor=#E9E9E9
| 36302 ||  || — || May 7, 2000 || Socorro || LINEAR || NEM || align=right | 5.1 km || 
|-id=303 bgcolor=#fefefe
| 36303 ||  || — || May 6, 2000 || Socorro || LINEAR || — || align=right | 2.6 km || 
|-id=304 bgcolor=#E9E9E9
| 36304 ||  || — || May 6, 2000 || Socorro || LINEAR || — || align=right | 3.5 km || 
|-id=305 bgcolor=#fefefe
| 36305 ||  || — || May 6, 2000 || Socorro || LINEAR || MAS || align=right | 2.0 km || 
|-id=306 bgcolor=#fefefe
| 36306 ||  || — || May 6, 2000 || Socorro || LINEAR || NYS || align=right | 2.3 km || 
|-id=307 bgcolor=#E9E9E9
| 36307 ||  || — || May 6, 2000 || Socorro || LINEAR || EUN || align=right | 5.4 km || 
|-id=308 bgcolor=#fefefe
| 36308 ||  || — || May 27, 2000 || Socorro || LINEAR || — || align=right | 1.7 km || 
|-id=309 bgcolor=#fefefe
| 36309 ||  || — || May 28, 2000 || Socorro || LINEAR || FLO || align=right | 1.7 km || 
|-id=310 bgcolor=#d6d6d6
| 36310 ||  || — || May 28, 2000 || Socorro || LINEAR || — || align=right | 4.8 km || 
|-id=311 bgcolor=#fefefe
| 36311 ||  || — || May 27, 2000 || Socorro || LINEAR || FLO || align=right | 2.8 km || 
|-id=312 bgcolor=#fefefe
| 36312 ||  || — || May 27, 2000 || Socorro || LINEAR || — || align=right | 1.6 km || 
|-id=313 bgcolor=#fefefe
| 36313 ||  || — || May 31, 2000 || Socorro || LINEAR || PHO || align=right | 3.6 km || 
|-id=314 bgcolor=#d6d6d6
| 36314 ||  || — || June 4, 2000 || Socorro || LINEAR || MEL || align=right | 14 km || 
|-id=315 bgcolor=#d6d6d6
| 36315 ||  || — || June 5, 2000 || Socorro || LINEAR || KOR || align=right | 6.2 km || 
|-id=316 bgcolor=#fefefe
| 36316 ||  || — || June 4, 2000 || Socorro || LINEAR || H || align=right | 3.4 km || 
|-id=317 bgcolor=#E9E9E9
| 36317 ||  || — || June 5, 2000 || Socorro || LINEAR || — || align=right | 3.5 km || 
|-id=318 bgcolor=#d6d6d6
| 36318 ||  || — || June 8, 2000 || Socorro || LINEAR || — || align=right | 6.2 km || 
|-id=319 bgcolor=#fefefe
| 36319 ||  || — || June 8, 2000 || Socorro || LINEAR || — || align=right | 2.3 km || 
|-id=320 bgcolor=#fefefe
| 36320 ||  || — || June 1, 2000 || Anderson Mesa || LONEOS || V || align=right | 2.6 km || 
|-id=321 bgcolor=#fefefe
| 36321 ||  || — || June 7, 2000 || Socorro || LINEAR || — || align=right | 4.2 km || 
|-id=322 bgcolor=#fefefe
| 36322 ||  || — || June 1, 2000 || Socorro || LINEAR || — || align=right | 2.4 km || 
|-id=323 bgcolor=#fefefe
| 36323 ||  || — || June 6, 2000 || Anderson Mesa || LONEOS || NYS || align=right | 2.0 km || 
|-id=324 bgcolor=#E9E9E9
| 36324 ||  || — || June 6, 2000 || Anderson Mesa || LONEOS || — || align=right | 3.0 km || 
|-id=325 bgcolor=#E9E9E9
| 36325 ||  || — || June 9, 2000 || Anderson Mesa || LONEOS || — || align=right | 3.1 km || 
|-id=326 bgcolor=#fefefe
| 36326 ||  || — || June 11, 2000 || Anderson Mesa || LONEOS || — || align=right | 2.4 km || 
|-id=327 bgcolor=#fefefe
| 36327 ||  || — || June 4, 2000 || Haleakala || NEAT || — || align=right | 2.4 km || 
|-id=328 bgcolor=#fefefe
| 36328 ||  || — || June 1, 2000 || Anderson Mesa || LONEOS || — || align=right | 2.3 km || 
|-id=329 bgcolor=#fefefe
| 36329 Philmetzger ||  ||  || June 1, 2000 || Anderson Mesa || LONEOS || ERI || align=right | 4.6 km || 
|-id=330 bgcolor=#fefefe
| 36330 ||  || — || June 26, 2000 || Socorro || LINEAR || — || align=right | 2.5 km || 
|-id=331 bgcolor=#fefefe
| 36331 ||  || — || June 26, 2000 || Socorro || LINEAR || NYS || align=right | 5.2 km || 
|-id=332 bgcolor=#E9E9E9
| 36332 ||  || — || July 2, 2000 || Kitt Peak || Spacewatch || BRU || align=right | 6.4 km || 
|-id=333 bgcolor=#fefefe
| 36333 ||  || — || July 7, 2000 || Socorro || LINEAR || — || align=right | 2.2 km || 
|-id=334 bgcolor=#fefefe
| 36334 ||  || — || July 7, 2000 || Socorro || LINEAR || — || align=right | 3.7 km || 
|-id=335 bgcolor=#fefefe
| 36335 ||  || — || July 7, 2000 || Socorro || LINEAR || NYS || align=right | 2.6 km || 
|-id=336 bgcolor=#E9E9E9
| 36336 ||  || — || July 7, 2000 || Socorro || LINEAR || — || align=right | 2.8 km || 
|-id=337 bgcolor=#fefefe
| 36337 ||  || — || July 4, 2000 || Kitt Peak || Spacewatch || FLO || align=right | 2.1 km || 
|-id=338 bgcolor=#d6d6d6
| 36338 ||  || — || July 7, 2000 || Socorro || LINEAR || — || align=right | 10 km || 
|-id=339 bgcolor=#fefefe
| 36339 ||  || — || July 7, 2000 || Ondřejov || P. Kušnirák || — || align=right | 2.8 km || 
|-id=340 bgcolor=#fefefe
| 36340 Vaduvescu ||  ||  || July 5, 2000 || Anderson Mesa || LONEOS || NYS || align=right | 3.5 km || 
|-id=341 bgcolor=#fefefe
| 36341 ||  || — || July 5, 2000 || Anderson Mesa || LONEOS || — || align=right | 1.9 km || 
|-id=342 bgcolor=#fefefe
| 36342 ||  || — || July 5, 2000 || Anderson Mesa || LONEOS || — || align=right | 5.5 km || 
|-id=343 bgcolor=#E9E9E9
| 36343 ||  || — || July 5, 2000 || Anderson Mesa || LONEOS || — || align=right | 7.2 km || 
|-id=344 bgcolor=#fefefe
| 36344 ||  || — || July 5, 2000 || Anderson Mesa || LONEOS || — || align=right | 2.5 km || 
|-id=345 bgcolor=#E9E9E9
| 36345 ||  || — || July 5, 2000 || Anderson Mesa || LONEOS || — || align=right | 2.3 km || 
|-id=346 bgcolor=#E9E9E9
| 36346 ||  || — || July 6, 2000 || Kitt Peak || Spacewatch || — || align=right | 8.0 km || 
|-id=347 bgcolor=#E9E9E9
| 36347 ||  || — || July 7, 2000 || Socorro || LINEAR || — || align=right | 4.6 km || 
|-id=348 bgcolor=#d6d6d6
| 36348 ||  || — || July 5, 2000 || Anderson Mesa || LONEOS || — || align=right | 9.5 km || 
|-id=349 bgcolor=#E9E9E9
| 36349 ||  || — || July 5, 2000 || Kitt Peak || Spacewatch || — || align=right | 3.0 km || 
|-id=350 bgcolor=#E9E9E9
| 36350 ||  || — || July 4, 2000 || Anderson Mesa || LONEOS || — || align=right | 5.1 km || 
|-id=351 bgcolor=#E9E9E9
| 36351 ||  || — || July 4, 2000 || Anderson Mesa || LONEOS || — || align=right | 2.4 km || 
|-id=352 bgcolor=#d6d6d6
| 36352 Erickmeza ||  ||  || July 4, 2000 || Anderson Mesa || LONEOS || KOR || align=right | 3.0 km || 
|-id=353 bgcolor=#fefefe
| 36353 ||  || — || July 4, 2000 || Anderson Mesa || LONEOS || — || align=right | 2.0 km || 
|-id=354 bgcolor=#fefefe
| 36354 ||  || — || July 4, 2000 || Anderson Mesa || LONEOS || — || align=right | 3.5 km || 
|-id=355 bgcolor=#fefefe
| 36355 ||  || — || July 4, 2000 || Anderson Mesa || LONEOS || — || align=right | 2.2 km || 
|-id=356 bgcolor=#E9E9E9
| 36356 ||  || — || July 2, 2000 || Kitt Peak || Spacewatch || — || align=right | 2.6 km || 
|-id=357 bgcolor=#fefefe
| 36357 ||  || — || July 28, 2000 || Črni Vrh || Črni Vrh || — || align=right | 2.7 km || 
|-id=358 bgcolor=#E9E9E9
| 36358 ||  || — || July 29, 2000 || Reedy Creek || J. Broughton || BRG || align=right | 4.2 km || 
|-id=359 bgcolor=#fefefe
| 36359 ||  || — || July 23, 2000 || Socorro || LINEAR || — || align=right | 2.1 km || 
|-id=360 bgcolor=#fefefe
| 36360 ||  || — || July 23, 2000 || Socorro || LINEAR || — || align=right | 4.7 km || 
|-id=361 bgcolor=#fefefe
| 36361 ||  || — || July 24, 2000 || Socorro || LINEAR || FLO || align=right | 1.7 km || 
|-id=362 bgcolor=#fefefe
| 36362 ||  || — || July 24, 2000 || Socorro || LINEAR || — || align=right | 2.3 km || 
|-id=363 bgcolor=#fefefe
| 36363 ||  || — || July 24, 2000 || Socorro || LINEAR || V || align=right | 2.3 km || 
|-id=364 bgcolor=#fefefe
| 36364 ||  || — || July 24, 2000 || Socorro || LINEAR || — || align=right | 5.7 km || 
|-id=365 bgcolor=#E9E9E9
| 36365 ||  || — || July 30, 2000 || Reedy Creek || J. Broughton || EUN || align=right | 4.0 km || 
|-id=366 bgcolor=#fefefe
| 36366 ||  || — || July 23, 2000 || Socorro || LINEAR || NYS || align=right | 1.7 km || 
|-id=367 bgcolor=#fefefe
| 36367 ||  || — || July 23, 2000 || Socorro || LINEAR || FLO || align=right | 1.9 km || 
|-id=368 bgcolor=#fefefe
| 36368 ||  || — || July 23, 2000 || Socorro || LINEAR || NYS || align=right | 2.1 km || 
|-id=369 bgcolor=#fefefe
| 36369 ||  || — || July 23, 2000 || Socorro || LINEAR || — || align=right | 2.2 km || 
|-id=370 bgcolor=#fefefe
| 36370 ||  || — || July 23, 2000 || Socorro || LINEAR || NYS || align=right | 2.6 km || 
|-id=371 bgcolor=#fefefe
| 36371 ||  || — || July 23, 2000 || Socorro || LINEAR || FLO || align=right | 3.2 km || 
|-id=372 bgcolor=#fefefe
| 36372 ||  || — || July 23, 2000 || Socorro || LINEAR || MAS || align=right | 2.1 km || 
|-id=373 bgcolor=#fefefe
| 36373 ||  || — || July 23, 2000 || Socorro || LINEAR || NYS || align=right | 2.9 km || 
|-id=374 bgcolor=#fefefe
| 36374 ||  || — || July 23, 2000 || Socorro || LINEAR || — || align=right | 2.4 km || 
|-id=375 bgcolor=#fefefe
| 36375 ||  || — || July 23, 2000 || Socorro || LINEAR || — || align=right | 2.4 km || 
|-id=376 bgcolor=#fefefe
| 36376 ||  || — || July 23, 2000 || Socorro || LINEAR || — || align=right | 2.1 km || 
|-id=377 bgcolor=#fefefe
| 36377 ||  || — || July 23, 2000 || Socorro || LINEAR || — || align=right | 2.1 km || 
|-id=378 bgcolor=#fefefe
| 36378 ||  || — || July 29, 2000 || Socorro || LINEAR || — || align=right | 4.1 km || 
|-id=379 bgcolor=#d6d6d6
| 36379 ||  || — || July 23, 2000 || Socorro || LINEAR || — || align=right | 8.0 km || 
|-id=380 bgcolor=#E9E9E9
| 36380 ||  || — || July 23, 2000 || Socorro || LINEAR || — || align=right | 5.3 km || 
|-id=381 bgcolor=#fefefe
| 36381 ||  || — || July 23, 2000 || Socorro || LINEAR || — || align=right | 2.4 km || 
|-id=382 bgcolor=#fefefe
| 36382 ||  || — || July 24, 2000 || Socorro || LINEAR || V || align=right | 2.1 km || 
|-id=383 bgcolor=#fefefe
| 36383 ||  || — || July 30, 2000 || Socorro || LINEAR || V || align=right | 2.1 km || 
|-id=384 bgcolor=#fefefe
| 36384 ||  || — || July 30, 2000 || Socorro || LINEAR || V || align=right | 2.1 km || 
|-id=385 bgcolor=#fefefe
| 36385 ||  || — || July 30, 2000 || Socorro || LINEAR || — || align=right | 2.0 km || 
|-id=386 bgcolor=#E9E9E9
| 36386 ||  || — || July 30, 2000 || Socorro || LINEAR || — || align=right | 2.4 km || 
|-id=387 bgcolor=#E9E9E9
| 36387 ||  || — || July 30, 2000 || Socorro || LINEAR || — || align=right | 2.5 km || 
|-id=388 bgcolor=#fefefe
| 36388 ||  || — || July 30, 2000 || Socorro || LINEAR || FLO || align=right | 1.9 km || 
|-id=389 bgcolor=#fefefe
| 36389 ||  || — || July 30, 2000 || Socorro || LINEAR || — || align=right | 2.0 km || 
|-id=390 bgcolor=#E9E9E9
| 36390 ||  || — || July 30, 2000 || Socorro || LINEAR || GER || align=right | 5.1 km || 
|-id=391 bgcolor=#fefefe
| 36391 ||  || — || July 30, 2000 || Socorro || LINEAR || — || align=right | 2.2 km || 
|-id=392 bgcolor=#d6d6d6
| 36392 ||  || — || July 30, 2000 || Socorro || LINEAR || — || align=right | 12 km || 
|-id=393 bgcolor=#E9E9E9
| 36393 ||  || — || July 30, 2000 || Socorro || LINEAR || — || align=right | 2.5 km || 
|-id=394 bgcolor=#E9E9E9
| 36394 ||  || — || July 30, 2000 || Socorro || LINEAR || — || align=right | 3.3 km || 
|-id=395 bgcolor=#E9E9E9
| 36395 ||  || — || July 30, 2000 || Socorro || LINEAR || — || align=right | 3.3 km || 
|-id=396 bgcolor=#fefefe
| 36396 ||  || — || July 30, 2000 || Socorro || LINEAR || V || align=right | 1.9 km || 
|-id=397 bgcolor=#E9E9E9
| 36397 ||  || — || July 30, 2000 || Socorro || LINEAR || — || align=right | 6.5 km || 
|-id=398 bgcolor=#fefefe
| 36398 ||  || — || July 30, 2000 || Socorro || LINEAR || — || align=right | 4.7 km || 
|-id=399 bgcolor=#fefefe
| 36399 ||  || — || July 31, 2000 || Socorro || LINEAR || — || align=right | 2.7 km || 
|-id=400 bgcolor=#E9E9E9
| 36400 ||  || — || July 31, 2000 || Socorro || LINEAR || — || align=right | 2.9 km || 
|}

36401–36500 

|-bgcolor=#fefefe
| 36401 ||  || — || July 31, 2000 || Socorro || LINEAR || — || align=right | 4.6 km || 
|-id=402 bgcolor=#E9E9E9
| 36402 ||  || — || July 31, 2000 || Socorro || LINEAR || — || align=right | 3.2 km || 
|-id=403 bgcolor=#fefefe
| 36403 ||  || — || July 31, 2000 || Socorro || LINEAR || — || align=right | 1.6 km || 
|-id=404 bgcolor=#E9E9E9
| 36404 ||  || — || July 31, 2000 || Socorro || LINEAR || — || align=right | 6.0 km || 
|-id=405 bgcolor=#fefefe
| 36405 ||  || — || July 31, 2000 || Socorro || LINEAR || — || align=right | 2.6 km || 
|-id=406 bgcolor=#fefefe
| 36406 ||  || — || July 31, 2000 || Socorro || LINEAR || FLO || align=right | 2.0 km || 
|-id=407 bgcolor=#E9E9E9
| 36407 ||  || — || July 31, 2000 || Socorro || LINEAR || — || align=right | 2.6 km || 
|-id=408 bgcolor=#fefefe
| 36408 ||  || — || July 31, 2000 || Socorro || LINEAR || NYS || align=right | 3.1 km || 
|-id=409 bgcolor=#fefefe
| 36409 ||  || — || July 31, 2000 || Socorro || LINEAR || NYS || align=right | 2.9 km || 
|-id=410 bgcolor=#fefefe
| 36410 ||  || — || July 31, 2000 || Socorro || LINEAR || V || align=right | 1.9 km || 
|-id=411 bgcolor=#E9E9E9
| 36411 ||  || — || July 31, 2000 || Socorro || LINEAR || MAR || align=right | 4.6 km || 
|-id=412 bgcolor=#fefefe
| 36412 ||  || — || July 31, 2000 || Socorro || LINEAR || FLO || align=right | 3.0 km || 
|-id=413 bgcolor=#fefefe
| 36413 ||  || — || July 31, 2000 || Socorro || LINEAR || — || align=right | 3.4 km || 
|-id=414 bgcolor=#E9E9E9
| 36414 ||  || — || July 31, 2000 || Socorro || LINEAR || — || align=right | 4.5 km || 
|-id=415 bgcolor=#E9E9E9
| 36415 ||  || — || July 31, 2000 || Socorro || LINEAR || — || align=right | 2.9 km || 
|-id=416 bgcolor=#E9E9E9
| 36416 ||  || — || July 31, 2000 || Socorro || LINEAR || — || align=right | 7.5 km || 
|-id=417 bgcolor=#fefefe
| 36417 ||  || — || July 31, 2000 || Socorro || LINEAR || MAS || align=right | 2.5 km || 
|-id=418 bgcolor=#fefefe
| 36418 ||  || — || July 29, 2000 || Anderson Mesa || LONEOS || — || align=right | 1.8 km || 
|-id=419 bgcolor=#fefefe
| 36419 ||  || — || July 29, 2000 || Anderson Mesa || LONEOS || — || align=right | 2.2 km || 
|-id=420 bgcolor=#fefefe
| 36420 ||  || — || July 29, 2000 || Anderson Mesa || LONEOS || NYS || align=right | 4.9 km || 
|-id=421 bgcolor=#fefefe
| 36421 ||  || — || July 29, 2000 || Anderson Mesa || LONEOS || MAS || align=right | 1.5 km || 
|-id=422 bgcolor=#fefefe
| 36422 ||  || — || July 23, 2000 || Socorro || LINEAR || NYS || align=right | 1.7 km || 
|-id=423 bgcolor=#fefefe
| 36423 ||  || — || August 1, 2000 || Socorro || LINEAR || FLO || align=right | 2.6 km || 
|-id=424 bgcolor=#fefefe
| 36424 Satokokumasaki ||  ||  || August 3, 2000 || Bisei SG Center || BATTeRS || — || align=right | 2.8 km || 
|-id=425 bgcolor=#C2FFFF
| 36425 ||  || — || August 5, 2000 || Prescott || P. G. Comba || L5 || align=right | 19 km || 
|-id=426 bgcolor=#fefefe
| 36426 Kakuda ||  ||  || August 5, 2000 || Bisei SG Center || BATTeRS || — || align=right | 2.3 km || 
|-id=427 bgcolor=#fefefe
| 36427 ||  || — || August 2, 2000 || Socorro || LINEAR || KLI || align=right | 6.9 km || 
|-id=428 bgcolor=#E9E9E9
| 36428 ||  || — || August 9, 2000 || Reedy Creek || J. Broughton || — || align=right | 4.2 km || 
|-id=429 bgcolor=#fefefe
| 36429 ||  || — || August 1, 2000 || Socorro || LINEAR || — || align=right | 2.8 km || 
|-id=430 bgcolor=#fefefe
| 36430 ||  || — || August 1, 2000 || Socorro || LINEAR || V || align=right | 1.7 km || 
|-id=431 bgcolor=#fefefe
| 36431 ||  || — || August 2, 2000 || Socorro || LINEAR || V || align=right | 2.6 km || 
|-id=432 bgcolor=#E9E9E9
| 36432 ||  || — || August 3, 2000 || Socorro || LINEAR || — || align=right | 3.4 km || 
|-id=433 bgcolor=#d6d6d6
| 36433 ||  || — || August 1, 2000 || Socorro || LINEAR || — || align=right | 6.9 km || 
|-id=434 bgcolor=#fefefe
| 36434 ||  || — || August 1, 2000 || Socorro || LINEAR || FLO || align=right | 1.8 km || 
|-id=435 bgcolor=#fefefe
| 36435 ||  || — || August 1, 2000 || Socorro || LINEAR || FLO || align=right | 2.8 km || 
|-id=436 bgcolor=#fefefe
| 36436 ||  || — || August 2, 2000 || Socorro || LINEAR || — || align=right | 2.0 km || 
|-id=437 bgcolor=#fefefe
| 36437 ||  || — || August 2, 2000 || Socorro || LINEAR || — || align=right | 2.6 km || 
|-id=438 bgcolor=#E9E9E9
| 36438 ||  || — || August 3, 2000 || Socorro || LINEAR || — || align=right | 6.6 km || 
|-id=439 bgcolor=#E9E9E9
| 36439 ||  || — || August 5, 2000 || Haleakala || NEAT || — || align=right | 4.8 km || 
|-id=440 bgcolor=#E9E9E9
| 36440 ||  || — || August 9, 2000 || Socorro || LINEAR || — || align=right | 2.8 km || 
|-id=441 bgcolor=#fefefe
| 36441 ||  || — || August 4, 2000 || Haleakala || NEAT || — || align=right | 5.2 km || 
|-id=442 bgcolor=#fefefe
| 36442 ||  || — || August 2, 2000 || Socorro || LINEAR || — || align=right | 2.0 km || 
|-id=443 bgcolor=#E9E9E9
| 36443 ||  || — || August 1, 2000 || Socorro || LINEAR || — || align=right | 5.5 km || 
|-id=444 bgcolor=#fefefe
| 36444 Clairblackburn ||  ||  || August 1, 2000 || Cerro Tololo || M. W. Buie || — || align=right | 2.3 km || 
|-id=445 bgcolor=#fefefe
| 36445 Smalley || 2000 QU ||  || August 23, 2000 || Olathe || L. Robinson || — || align=right | 3.9 km || 
|-id=446 bgcolor=#fefefe
| 36446 Cinodapistoia || 2000 QV ||  || August 22, 2000 || San Marcello || L. Tesi, A. Boattini || NYS || align=right | 2.0 km || 
|-id=447 bgcolor=#fefefe
| 36447 ||  || — || August 23, 2000 || Gnosca || S. Sposetti || FLO || align=right | 3.6 km || 
|-id=448 bgcolor=#fefefe
| 36448 ||  || — || August 24, 2000 || Socorro || LINEAR || H || align=right | 1.3 km || 
|-id=449 bgcolor=#fefefe
| 36449 ||  || — || August 24, 2000 || Socorro || LINEAR || FLO || align=right | 2.3 km || 
|-id=450 bgcolor=#fefefe
| 36450 ||  || — || August 24, 2000 || Socorro || LINEAR || FLO || align=right | 2.3 km || 
|-id=451 bgcolor=#d6d6d6
| 36451 ||  || — || August 24, 2000 || Socorro || LINEAR || HYG || align=right | 7.7 km || 
|-id=452 bgcolor=#d6d6d6
| 36452 ||  || — || August 24, 2000 || Socorro || LINEAR || — || align=right | 5.9 km || 
|-id=453 bgcolor=#fefefe
| 36453 ||  || — || August 24, 2000 || Socorro || LINEAR || — || align=right | 1.9 km || 
|-id=454 bgcolor=#E9E9E9
| 36454 ||  || — || August 24, 2000 || Socorro || LINEAR || — || align=right | 2.5 km || 
|-id=455 bgcolor=#fefefe
| 36455 ||  || — || August 24, 2000 || Socorro || LINEAR || — || align=right | 3.7 km || 
|-id=456 bgcolor=#fefefe
| 36456 ||  || — || August 25, 2000 || Višnjan Observatory || K. Korlević, M. Jurić || NYS || align=right | 2.1 km || 
|-id=457 bgcolor=#fefefe
| 36457 ||  || — || August 25, 2000 || Višnjan Observatory || K. Korlević, M. Jurić || NYS || align=right | 2.1 km || 
|-id=458 bgcolor=#fefefe
| 36458 ||  || — || August 25, 2000 || Višnjan Observatory || K. Korlević, M. Jurić || FLO || align=right | 2.0 km || 
|-id=459 bgcolor=#fefefe
| 36459 ||  || — || August 24, 2000 || Črni Vrh || Črni Vrh || V || align=right | 2.3 km || 
|-id=460 bgcolor=#E9E9E9
| 36460 ||  || — || August 25, 2000 || Črni Vrh || Črni Vrh || — || align=right | 4.1 km || 
|-id=461 bgcolor=#E9E9E9
| 36461 ||  || — || August 25, 2000 || Črni Vrh || Črni Vrh || — || align=right | 6.6 km || 
|-id=462 bgcolor=#d6d6d6
| 36462 ||  || — || August 24, 2000 || Socorro || LINEAR || — || align=right | 4.2 km || 
|-id=463 bgcolor=#d6d6d6
| 36463 ||  || — || August 24, 2000 || Socorro || LINEAR || — || align=right | 6.1 km || 
|-id=464 bgcolor=#E9E9E9
| 36464 ||  || — || August 24, 2000 || Socorro || LINEAR || AGN || align=right | 3.1 km || 
|-id=465 bgcolor=#fefefe
| 36465 ||  || — || August 24, 2000 || Socorro || LINEAR || NYS || align=right | 4.9 km || 
|-id=466 bgcolor=#fefefe
| 36466 ||  || — || August 25, 2000 || Socorro || LINEAR || MAS || align=right | 2.2 km || 
|-id=467 bgcolor=#fefefe
| 36467 ||  || — || August 25, 2000 || Socorro || LINEAR || — || align=right | 1.9 km || 
|-id=468 bgcolor=#fefefe
| 36468 ||  || — || August 25, 2000 || Socorro || LINEAR || KLI || align=right | 5.2 km || 
|-id=469 bgcolor=#fefefe
| 36469 ||  || — || August 25, 2000 || Socorro || LINEAR || NYS || align=right | 5.0 km || 
|-id=470 bgcolor=#fefefe
| 36470 ||  || — || August 25, 2000 || Socorro || LINEAR || — || align=right | 3.1 km || 
|-id=471 bgcolor=#E9E9E9
| 36471 ||  || — || August 27, 2000 || Ondřejov || P. Pravec, P. Kušnirák || — || align=right | 6.6 km || 
|-id=472 bgcolor=#fefefe
| 36472 Ebina ||  ||  || August 27, 2000 || Bisei SG Center || BATTeRS || FLO || align=right | 1.9 km || 
|-id=473 bgcolor=#fefefe
| 36473 ||  || — || August 24, 2000 || Socorro || LINEAR || NYS || align=right | 4.5 km || 
|-id=474 bgcolor=#E9E9E9
| 36474 ||  || — || August 24, 2000 || Socorro || LINEAR || — || align=right | 3.5 km || 
|-id=475 bgcolor=#fefefe
| 36475 ||  || — || August 24, 2000 || Socorro || LINEAR || V || align=right | 2.2 km || 
|-id=476 bgcolor=#E9E9E9
| 36476 ||  || — || August 24, 2000 || Socorro || LINEAR || — || align=right | 6.0 km || 
|-id=477 bgcolor=#d6d6d6
| 36477 ||  || — || August 24, 2000 || Socorro || LINEAR || THM || align=right | 6.5 km || 
|-id=478 bgcolor=#fefefe
| 36478 ||  || — || August 24, 2000 || Socorro || LINEAR || — || align=right | 6.5 km || 
|-id=479 bgcolor=#E9E9E9
| 36479 ||  || — || August 25, 2000 || Socorro || LINEAR || — || align=right | 3.7 km || 
|-id=480 bgcolor=#fefefe
| 36480 ||  || — || August 25, 2000 || Socorro || LINEAR || V || align=right | 2.2 km || 
|-id=481 bgcolor=#fefefe
| 36481 ||  || — || August 25, 2000 || Socorro || LINEAR || V || align=right | 2.0 km || 
|-id=482 bgcolor=#fefefe
| 36482 ||  || — || August 26, 2000 || Socorro || LINEAR || — || align=right | 2.4 km || 
|-id=483 bgcolor=#d6d6d6
| 36483 ||  || — || August 26, 2000 || Socorro || LINEAR || HYG || align=right | 6.6 km || 
|-id=484 bgcolor=#E9E9E9
| 36484 ||  || — || August 24, 2000 || Socorro || LINEAR || — || align=right | 3.2 km || 
|-id=485 bgcolor=#fefefe
| 36485 ||  || — || August 24, 2000 || Socorro || LINEAR || SUL || align=right | 6.6 km || 
|-id=486 bgcolor=#fefefe
| 36486 ||  || — || August 24, 2000 || Socorro || LINEAR || — || align=right | 1.9 km || 
|-id=487 bgcolor=#fefefe
| 36487 ||  || — || August 24, 2000 || Socorro || LINEAR || FLO || align=right | 2.6 km || 
|-id=488 bgcolor=#d6d6d6
| 36488 ||  || — || August 24, 2000 || Socorro || LINEAR || — || align=right | 3.8 km || 
|-id=489 bgcolor=#E9E9E9
| 36489 ||  || — || August 24, 2000 || Socorro || LINEAR || — || align=right | 7.8 km || 
|-id=490 bgcolor=#fefefe
| 36490 ||  || — || August 24, 2000 || Socorro || LINEAR || NYS || align=right | 2.1 km || 
|-id=491 bgcolor=#fefefe
| 36491 ||  || — || August 24, 2000 || Socorro || LINEAR || NYS || align=right | 3.4 km || 
|-id=492 bgcolor=#E9E9E9
| 36492 ||  || — || August 24, 2000 || Socorro || LINEAR || — || align=right | 3.4 km || 
|-id=493 bgcolor=#E9E9E9
| 36493 ||  || — || August 24, 2000 || Socorro || LINEAR || — || align=right | 8.0 km || 
|-id=494 bgcolor=#d6d6d6
| 36494 ||  || — || August 24, 2000 || Socorro || LINEAR || ITH || align=right | 5.2 km || 
|-id=495 bgcolor=#fefefe
| 36495 ||  || — || August 24, 2000 || Socorro || LINEAR || — || align=right | 4.7 km || 
|-id=496 bgcolor=#fefefe
| 36496 ||  || — || August 24, 2000 || Socorro || LINEAR || NYS || align=right | 2.3 km || 
|-id=497 bgcolor=#E9E9E9
| 36497 ||  || — || August 24, 2000 || Socorro || LINEAR || AGN || align=right | 3.1 km || 
|-id=498 bgcolor=#fefefe
| 36498 ||  || — || August 25, 2000 || Socorro || LINEAR || — || align=right | 3.2 km || 
|-id=499 bgcolor=#fefefe
| 36499 ||  || — || August 25, 2000 || Socorro || LINEAR || NYS || align=right | 2.2 km || 
|-id=500 bgcolor=#fefefe
| 36500 ||  || — || August 25, 2000 || Socorro || LINEAR || FLO || align=right | 1.8 km || 
|}

36501–36600 

|-bgcolor=#E9E9E9
| 36501 ||  || — || August 26, 2000 || Socorro || LINEAR || WAT || align=right | 9.6 km || 
|-id=502 bgcolor=#fefefe
| 36502 ||  || — || August 26, 2000 || Socorro || LINEAR || — || align=right | 1.6 km || 
|-id=503 bgcolor=#E9E9E9
| 36503 ||  || — || August 26, 2000 || Socorro || LINEAR || — || align=right | 3.3 km || 
|-id=504 bgcolor=#d6d6d6
| 36504 ||  || — || August 26, 2000 || Socorro || LINEAR || — || align=right | 7.4 km || 
|-id=505 bgcolor=#fefefe
| 36505 ||  || — || August 28, 2000 || Socorro || LINEAR || — || align=right | 2.4 km || 
|-id=506 bgcolor=#fefefe
| 36506 ||  || — || August 28, 2000 || Socorro || LINEAR || — || align=right | 2.3 km || 
|-id=507 bgcolor=#d6d6d6
| 36507 ||  || — || August 28, 2000 || Socorro || LINEAR || NAE || align=right | 7.0 km || 
|-id=508 bgcolor=#fefefe
| 36508 ||  || — || August 27, 2000 || Višnjan Observatory || K. Korlević || — || align=right | 2.0 km || 
|-id=509 bgcolor=#E9E9E9
| 36509 ||  || — || August 24, 2000 || Socorro || LINEAR || — || align=right | 3.2 km || 
|-id=510 bgcolor=#E9E9E9
| 36510 ||  || — || August 24, 2000 || Socorro || LINEAR || — || align=right | 3.3 km || 
|-id=511 bgcolor=#E9E9E9
| 36511 ||  || — || August 24, 2000 || Socorro || LINEAR || NEM || align=right | 5.7 km || 
|-id=512 bgcolor=#fefefe
| 36512 ||  || — || August 24, 2000 || Socorro || LINEAR || NYS || align=right | 4.5 km || 
|-id=513 bgcolor=#fefefe
| 36513 ||  || — || August 24, 2000 || Socorro || LINEAR || — || align=right | 1.5 km || 
|-id=514 bgcolor=#d6d6d6
| 36514 ||  || — || August 24, 2000 || Socorro || LINEAR || — || align=right | 6.8 km || 
|-id=515 bgcolor=#fefefe
| 36515 ||  || — || August 24, 2000 || Socorro || LINEAR || V || align=right | 2.1 km || 
|-id=516 bgcolor=#E9E9E9
| 36516 ||  || — || August 24, 2000 || Socorro || LINEAR || — || align=right | 3.5 km || 
|-id=517 bgcolor=#d6d6d6
| 36517 ||  || — || August 24, 2000 || Socorro || LINEAR || KOR || align=right | 3.0 km || 
|-id=518 bgcolor=#d6d6d6
| 36518 ||  || — || August 24, 2000 || Socorro || LINEAR || KOR || align=right | 3.5 km || 
|-id=519 bgcolor=#E9E9E9
| 36519 ||  || — || August 24, 2000 || Socorro || LINEAR || AGN || align=right | 3.6 km || 
|-id=520 bgcolor=#fefefe
| 36520 ||  || — || August 24, 2000 || Socorro || LINEAR || — || align=right | 3.9 km || 
|-id=521 bgcolor=#E9E9E9
| 36521 ||  || — || August 24, 2000 || Socorro || LINEAR || JUN || align=right | 4.4 km || 
|-id=522 bgcolor=#fefefe
| 36522 ||  || — || August 24, 2000 || Socorro || LINEAR || FLO || align=right | 2.9 km || 
|-id=523 bgcolor=#E9E9E9
| 36523 ||  || — || August 24, 2000 || Socorro || LINEAR || — || align=right | 2.7 km || 
|-id=524 bgcolor=#E9E9E9
| 36524 ||  || — || August 24, 2000 || Socorro || LINEAR || — || align=right | 3.3 km || 
|-id=525 bgcolor=#fefefe
| 36525 ||  || — || August 24, 2000 || Socorro || LINEAR || FLO || align=right | 1.9 km || 
|-id=526 bgcolor=#fefefe
| 36526 ||  || — || August 24, 2000 || Socorro || LINEAR || — || align=right | 2.1 km || 
|-id=527 bgcolor=#E9E9E9
| 36527 ||  || — || August 24, 2000 || Socorro || LINEAR || — || align=right | 5.5 km || 
|-id=528 bgcolor=#fefefe
| 36528 ||  || — || August 24, 2000 || Socorro || LINEAR || MAS || align=right | 1.6 km || 
|-id=529 bgcolor=#d6d6d6
| 36529 ||  || — || August 24, 2000 || Socorro || LINEAR || — || align=right | 5.4 km || 
|-id=530 bgcolor=#E9E9E9
| 36530 ||  || — || August 24, 2000 || Socorro || LINEAR || — || align=right | 2.7 km || 
|-id=531 bgcolor=#fefefe
| 36531 ||  || — || August 24, 2000 || Socorro || LINEAR || NYS || align=right | 4.3 km || 
|-id=532 bgcolor=#fefefe
| 36532 ||  || — || August 25, 2000 || Socorro || LINEAR || V || align=right | 1.8 km || 
|-id=533 bgcolor=#fefefe
| 36533 ||  || — || August 25, 2000 || Socorro || LINEAR || V || align=right | 1.9 km || 
|-id=534 bgcolor=#E9E9E9
| 36534 ||  || — || August 25, 2000 || Socorro || LINEAR || — || align=right | 3.7 km || 
|-id=535 bgcolor=#fefefe
| 36535 ||  || — || August 25, 2000 || Socorro || LINEAR || — || align=right | 2.4 km || 
|-id=536 bgcolor=#fefefe
| 36536 ||  || — || August 25, 2000 || Socorro || LINEAR || FLO || align=right | 2.3 km || 
|-id=537 bgcolor=#E9E9E9
| 36537 ||  || — || August 25, 2000 || Socorro || LINEAR || — || align=right | 5.5 km || 
|-id=538 bgcolor=#fefefe
| 36538 ||  || — || August 25, 2000 || Socorro || LINEAR || — || align=right | 5.4 km || 
|-id=539 bgcolor=#fefefe
| 36539 ||  || — || August 25, 2000 || Socorro || LINEAR || V || align=right | 2.2 km || 
|-id=540 bgcolor=#d6d6d6
| 36540 ||  || — || August 25, 2000 || Socorro || LINEAR || THM || align=right | 8.8 km || 
|-id=541 bgcolor=#fefefe
| 36541 ||  || — || August 26, 2000 || Socorro || LINEAR || — || align=right | 1.9 km || 
|-id=542 bgcolor=#d6d6d6
| 36542 ||  || — || August 28, 2000 || Socorro || LINEAR || HYG || align=right | 7.6 km || 
|-id=543 bgcolor=#E9E9E9
| 36543 ||  || — || August 28, 2000 || Socorro || LINEAR || — || align=right | 2.6 km || 
|-id=544 bgcolor=#d6d6d6
| 36544 ||  || — || August 28, 2000 || Socorro || LINEAR || — || align=right | 7.3 km || 
|-id=545 bgcolor=#fefefe
| 36545 ||  || — || August 28, 2000 || Socorro || LINEAR || — || align=right | 2.9 km || 
|-id=546 bgcolor=#fefefe
| 36546 ||  || — || August 28, 2000 || Socorro || LINEAR || — || align=right | 5.8 km || 
|-id=547 bgcolor=#fefefe
| 36547 ||  || — || August 28, 2000 || Socorro || LINEAR || V || align=right | 1.8 km || 
|-id=548 bgcolor=#fefefe
| 36548 ||  || — || August 28, 2000 || Socorro || LINEAR || — || align=right | 5.7 km || 
|-id=549 bgcolor=#fefefe
| 36549 ||  || — || August 28, 2000 || Socorro || LINEAR || — || align=right | 4.1 km || 
|-id=550 bgcolor=#E9E9E9
| 36550 ||  || — || August 28, 2000 || Socorro || LINEAR || — || align=right | 3.4 km || 
|-id=551 bgcolor=#d6d6d6
| 36551 ||  || — || August 28, 2000 || Socorro || LINEAR || — || align=right | 10 km || 
|-id=552 bgcolor=#fefefe
| 36552 ||  || — || August 28, 2000 || Socorro || LINEAR || — || align=right | 2.6 km || 
|-id=553 bgcolor=#E9E9E9
| 36553 ||  || — || August 28, 2000 || Socorro || LINEAR || — || align=right | 7.7 km || 
|-id=554 bgcolor=#d6d6d6
| 36554 ||  || — || August 28, 2000 || Socorro || LINEAR || — || align=right | 8.4 km || 
|-id=555 bgcolor=#E9E9E9
| 36555 ||  || — || August 28, 2000 || Socorro || LINEAR || — || align=right | 2.2 km || 
|-id=556 bgcolor=#E9E9E9
| 36556 ||  || — || August 28, 2000 || Socorro || LINEAR || MRX || align=right | 2.8 km || 
|-id=557 bgcolor=#d6d6d6
| 36557 ||  || — || August 28, 2000 || Socorro || LINEAR || — || align=right | 4.4 km || 
|-id=558 bgcolor=#fefefe
| 36558 ||  || — || August 28, 2000 || Socorro || LINEAR || — || align=right | 2.3 km || 
|-id=559 bgcolor=#fefefe
| 36559 ||  || — || August 28, 2000 || Socorro || LINEAR || — || align=right | 3.6 km || 
|-id=560 bgcolor=#E9E9E9
| 36560 ||  || — || August 29, 2000 || Socorro || LINEAR || HEN || align=right | 2.9 km || 
|-id=561 bgcolor=#E9E9E9
| 36561 ||  || — || August 29, 2000 || Socorro || LINEAR || — || align=right | 2.3 km || 
|-id=562 bgcolor=#E9E9E9
| 36562 ||  || — || August 26, 2000 || Bergisch Gladbach || W. Bickel || — || align=right | 5.6 km || 
|-id=563 bgcolor=#fefefe
| 36563 ||  || — || August 24, 2000 || Socorro || LINEAR || FLO || align=right | 3.3 km || 
|-id=564 bgcolor=#E9E9E9
| 36564 ||  || — || August 28, 2000 || Socorro || LINEAR || — || align=right | 4.1 km || 
|-id=565 bgcolor=#fefefe
| 36565 ||  || — || August 25, 2000 || Socorro || LINEAR || — || align=right | 2.9 km || 
|-id=566 bgcolor=#fefefe
| 36566 ||  || — || August 25, 2000 || Socorro || LINEAR || — || align=right | 4.1 km || 
|-id=567 bgcolor=#fefefe
| 36567 ||  || — || August 25, 2000 || Socorro || LINEAR || — || align=right | 2.2 km || 
|-id=568 bgcolor=#fefefe
| 36568 ||  || — || August 25, 2000 || Socorro || LINEAR || FLO || align=right | 1.5 km || 
|-id=569 bgcolor=#E9E9E9
| 36569 ||  || — || August 25, 2000 || Socorro || LINEAR || EUN || align=right | 3.8 km || 
|-id=570 bgcolor=#E9E9E9
| 36570 ||  || — || August 25, 2000 || Socorro || LINEAR || — || align=right | 3.4 km || 
|-id=571 bgcolor=#E9E9E9
| 36571 ||  || — || August 25, 2000 || Socorro || LINEAR || — || align=right | 2.7 km || 
|-id=572 bgcolor=#E9E9E9
| 36572 ||  || — || August 25, 2000 || Socorro || LINEAR || MAR || align=right | 6.1 km || 
|-id=573 bgcolor=#fefefe
| 36573 ||  || — || August 25, 2000 || Socorro || LINEAR || V || align=right | 1.7 km || 
|-id=574 bgcolor=#fefefe
| 36574 ||  || — || August 25, 2000 || Socorro || LINEAR || — || align=right | 4.6 km || 
|-id=575 bgcolor=#E9E9E9
| 36575 ||  || — || August 25, 2000 || Socorro || LINEAR || — || align=right | 9.1 km || 
|-id=576 bgcolor=#fefefe
| 36576 ||  || — || August 25, 2000 || Socorro || LINEAR || — || align=right | 3.1 km || 
|-id=577 bgcolor=#fefefe
| 36577 ||  || — || August 25, 2000 || Socorro || LINEAR || — || align=right | 4.5 km || 
|-id=578 bgcolor=#fefefe
| 36578 ||  || — || August 29, 2000 || Socorro || LINEAR || — || align=right | 2.5 km || 
|-id=579 bgcolor=#fefefe
| 36579 ||  || — || August 29, 2000 || Socorro || LINEAR || — || align=right | 1.8 km || 
|-id=580 bgcolor=#E9E9E9
| 36580 ||  || — || August 29, 2000 || Socorro || LINEAR || — || align=right | 2.2 km || 
|-id=581 bgcolor=#fefefe
| 36581 ||  || — || August 29, 2000 || Socorro || LINEAR || FLO || align=right | 1.8 km || 
|-id=582 bgcolor=#E9E9E9
| 36582 ||  || — || August 31, 2000 || Socorro || LINEAR || — || align=right | 3.2 km || 
|-id=583 bgcolor=#fefefe
| 36583 ||  || — || August 31, 2000 || Socorro || LINEAR || — || align=right | 2.0 km || 
|-id=584 bgcolor=#d6d6d6
| 36584 ||  || — || August 24, 2000 || Socorro || LINEAR || — || align=right | 7.2 km || 
|-id=585 bgcolor=#fefefe
| 36585 ||  || — || August 24, 2000 || Socorro || LINEAR || NYS || align=right | 2.4 km || 
|-id=586 bgcolor=#fefefe
| 36586 ||  || — || August 24, 2000 || Socorro || LINEAR || — || align=right | 3.1 km || 
|-id=587 bgcolor=#d6d6d6
| 36587 ||  || — || August 24, 2000 || Socorro || LINEAR || — || align=right | 18 km || 
|-id=588 bgcolor=#fefefe
| 36588 ||  || — || August 26, 2000 || Socorro || LINEAR || V || align=right | 1.6 km || 
|-id=589 bgcolor=#fefefe
| 36589 ||  || — || August 30, 2000 || Višnjan Observatory || K. Korlević || — || align=right | 7.4 km || 
|-id=590 bgcolor=#d6d6d6
| 36590 ||  || — || August 26, 2000 || Socorro || LINEAR || KOR || align=right | 2.7 km || 
|-id=591 bgcolor=#E9E9E9
| 36591 ||  || — || August 26, 2000 || Socorro || LINEAR || — || align=right | 5.6 km || 
|-id=592 bgcolor=#d6d6d6
| 36592 ||  || — || August 26, 2000 || Socorro || LINEAR || — || align=right | 8.2 km || 
|-id=593 bgcolor=#E9E9E9
| 36593 ||  || — || August 26, 2000 || Socorro || LINEAR || PAD || align=right | 4.5 km || 
|-id=594 bgcolor=#fefefe
| 36594 ||  || — || August 26, 2000 || Socorro || LINEAR || — || align=right | 1.5 km || 
|-id=595 bgcolor=#E9E9E9
| 36595 ||  || — || August 26, 2000 || Socorro || LINEAR || — || align=right | 4.0 km || 
|-id=596 bgcolor=#fefefe
| 36596 ||  || — || August 26, 2000 || Socorro || LINEAR || NYS || align=right | 4.3 km || 
|-id=597 bgcolor=#E9E9E9
| 36597 ||  || — || August 28, 2000 || Socorro || LINEAR || MIS || align=right | 5.2 km || 
|-id=598 bgcolor=#d6d6d6
| 36598 ||  || — || August 31, 2000 || Socorro || LINEAR || — || align=right | 7.5 km || 
|-id=599 bgcolor=#fefefe
| 36599 ||  || — || August 31, 2000 || Socorro || LINEAR || V || align=right | 2.2 km || 
|-id=600 bgcolor=#d6d6d6
| 36600 ||  || — || August 31, 2000 || Socorro || LINEAR || — || align=right | 3.1 km || 
|}

36601–36700 

|-bgcolor=#fefefe
| 36601 ||  || — || August 31, 2000 || Socorro || LINEAR || — || align=right | 5.0 km || 
|-id=602 bgcolor=#E9E9E9
| 36602 ||  || — || August 31, 2000 || Socorro || LINEAR || — || align=right | 2.6 km || 
|-id=603 bgcolor=#fefefe
| 36603 ||  || — || August 31, 2000 || Socorro || LINEAR || MAS || align=right | 2.3 km || 
|-id=604 bgcolor=#E9E9E9
| 36604 ||  || — || August 31, 2000 || Socorro || LINEAR || — || align=right | 2.6 km || 
|-id=605 bgcolor=#E9E9E9
| 36605 ||  || — || August 31, 2000 || Socorro || LINEAR || PAD || align=right | 4.7 km || 
|-id=606 bgcolor=#d6d6d6
| 36606 ||  || — || August 31, 2000 || Socorro || LINEAR || — || align=right | 4.5 km || 
|-id=607 bgcolor=#fefefe
| 36607 ||  || — || August 31, 2000 || Socorro || LINEAR || V || align=right | 2.5 km || 
|-id=608 bgcolor=#fefefe
| 36608 ||  || — || August 31, 2000 || Socorro || LINEAR || MAS || align=right | 2.8 km || 
|-id=609 bgcolor=#d6d6d6
| 36609 ||  || — || August 31, 2000 || Socorro || LINEAR || KOR || align=right | 3.5 km || 
|-id=610 bgcolor=#E9E9E9
| 36610 ||  || — || August 31, 2000 || Socorro || LINEAR || — || align=right | 2.7 km || 
|-id=611 bgcolor=#fefefe
| 36611 ||  || — || August 31, 2000 || Socorro || LINEAR || — || align=right | 3.4 km || 
|-id=612 bgcolor=#E9E9E9
| 36612 ||  || — || August 31, 2000 || Socorro || LINEAR || — || align=right | 5.8 km || 
|-id=613 bgcolor=#E9E9E9
| 36613 ||  || — || August 31, 2000 || Socorro || LINEAR || — || align=right | 5.3 km || 
|-id=614 bgcolor=#fefefe
| 36614 Saltis ||  ||  || August 27, 2000 || Stockholm || A. Brandeker || NYS || align=right | 2.0 km || 
|-id=615 bgcolor=#fefefe
| 36615 ||  || — || August 24, 2000 || Socorro || LINEAR || NYS || align=right | 2.5 km || 
|-id=616 bgcolor=#fefefe
| 36616 ||  || — || August 25, 2000 || Socorro || LINEAR || — || align=right | 2.4 km || 
|-id=617 bgcolor=#E9E9E9
| 36617 ||  || — || August 25, 2000 || Socorro || LINEAR || — || align=right | 7.1 km || 
|-id=618 bgcolor=#fefefe
| 36618 ||  || — || August 25, 2000 || Socorro || LINEAR || V || align=right | 2.3 km || 
|-id=619 bgcolor=#fefefe
| 36619 ||  || — || August 25, 2000 || Socorro || LINEAR || FLO || align=right | 4.6 km || 
|-id=620 bgcolor=#d6d6d6
| 36620 ||  || — || August 25, 2000 || Socorro || LINEAR || — || align=right | 6.9 km || 
|-id=621 bgcolor=#E9E9E9
| 36621 ||  || — || August 25, 2000 || Socorro || LINEAR || — || align=right | 4.2 km || 
|-id=622 bgcolor=#E9E9E9
| 36622 ||  || — || August 28, 2000 || Socorro || LINEAR || RAF || align=right | 4.5 km || 
|-id=623 bgcolor=#E9E9E9
| 36623 ||  || — || August 31, 2000 || Socorro || LINEAR || — || align=right | 6.2 km || 
|-id=624 bgcolor=#C2FFFF
| 36624 ||  || — || August 31, 2000 || Socorro || LINEAR || L5ENM || align=right | 32 km || 
|-id=625 bgcolor=#E9E9E9
| 36625 ||  || — || August 31, 2000 || Socorro || LINEAR || — || align=right | 6.6 km || 
|-id=626 bgcolor=#fefefe
| 36626 ||  || — || August 31, 2000 || Socorro || LINEAR || — || align=right | 2.0 km || 
|-id=627 bgcolor=#E9E9E9
| 36627 ||  || — || August 31, 2000 || Socorro || LINEAR || — || align=right | 3.7 km || 
|-id=628 bgcolor=#E9E9E9
| 36628 ||  || — || August 31, 2000 || Socorro || LINEAR || — || align=right | 3.2 km || 
|-id=629 bgcolor=#fefefe
| 36629 ||  || — || August 31, 2000 || Socorro || LINEAR || — || align=right | 2.1 km || 
|-id=630 bgcolor=#fefefe
| 36630 ||  || — || August 31, 2000 || Socorro || LINEAR || NYS || align=right | 2.4 km || 
|-id=631 bgcolor=#fefefe
| 36631 ||  || — || August 31, 2000 || Socorro || LINEAR || — || align=right | 3.4 km || 
|-id=632 bgcolor=#fefefe
| 36632 ||  || — || August 31, 2000 || Socorro || LINEAR || FLO || align=right | 2.2 km || 
|-id=633 bgcolor=#E9E9E9
| 36633 ||  || — || August 31, 2000 || Socorro || LINEAR || — || align=right | 2.9 km || 
|-id=634 bgcolor=#E9E9E9
| 36634 ||  || — || August 31, 2000 || Socorro || LINEAR || — || align=right | 3.6 km || 
|-id=635 bgcolor=#fefefe
| 36635 ||  || — || August 31, 2000 || Socorro || LINEAR || V || align=right | 2.1 km || 
|-id=636 bgcolor=#fefefe
| 36636 ||  || — || August 31, 2000 || Socorro || LINEAR || — || align=right | 1.9 km || 
|-id=637 bgcolor=#E9E9E9
| 36637 ||  || — || August 31, 2000 || Socorro || LINEAR || — || align=right | 6.9 km || 
|-id=638 bgcolor=#d6d6d6
| 36638 ||  || — || August 31, 2000 || Socorro || LINEAR || — || align=right | 3.9 km || 
|-id=639 bgcolor=#E9E9E9
| 36639 ||  || — || August 31, 2000 || Socorro || LINEAR || — || align=right | 2.0 km || 
|-id=640 bgcolor=#fefefe
| 36640 ||  || — || August 26, 2000 || Socorro || LINEAR || FLO || align=right | 1.9 km || 
|-id=641 bgcolor=#d6d6d6
| 36641 ||  || — || August 26, 2000 || Socorro || LINEAR || — || align=right | 7.6 km || 
|-id=642 bgcolor=#fefefe
| 36642 ||  || — || August 26, 2000 || Socorro || LINEAR || — || align=right | 2.2 km || 
|-id=643 bgcolor=#fefefe
| 36643 ||  || — || August 26, 2000 || Socorro || LINEAR || — || align=right | 2.0 km || 
|-id=644 bgcolor=#fefefe
| 36644 ||  || — || August 26, 2000 || Socorro || LINEAR || — || align=right | 2.0 km || 
|-id=645 bgcolor=#E9E9E9
| 36645 ||  || — || August 26, 2000 || Socorro || LINEAR || — || align=right | 4.1 km || 
|-id=646 bgcolor=#d6d6d6
| 36646 ||  || — || August 26, 2000 || Socorro || LINEAR || — || align=right | 12 km || 
|-id=647 bgcolor=#d6d6d6
| 36647 ||  || — || August 26, 2000 || Socorro || LINEAR || EOS || align=right | 5.1 km || 
|-id=648 bgcolor=#d6d6d6
| 36648 ||  || — || August 26, 2000 || Socorro || LINEAR || — || align=right | 4.2 km || 
|-id=649 bgcolor=#E9E9E9
| 36649 ||  || — || August 26, 2000 || Socorro || LINEAR || — || align=right | 6.2 km || 
|-id=650 bgcolor=#fefefe
| 36650 ||  || — || August 29, 2000 || Socorro || LINEAR || NYS || align=right | 2.3 km || 
|-id=651 bgcolor=#fefefe
| 36651 ||  || — || August 29, 2000 || Socorro || LINEAR || — || align=right | 1.7 km || 
|-id=652 bgcolor=#E9E9E9
| 36652 ||  || — || August 29, 2000 || Socorro || LINEAR || — || align=right | 2.3 km || 
|-id=653 bgcolor=#fefefe
| 36653 ||  || — || August 29, 2000 || Socorro || LINEAR || — || align=right | 4.4 km || 
|-id=654 bgcolor=#E9E9E9
| 36654 ||  || — || August 29, 2000 || Socorro || LINEAR || — || align=right | 2.5 km || 
|-id=655 bgcolor=#E9E9E9
| 36655 ||  || — || August 29, 2000 || Socorro || LINEAR || — || align=right | 3.9 km || 
|-id=656 bgcolor=#d6d6d6
| 36656 ||  || — || August 29, 2000 || Socorro || LINEAR || — || align=right | 8.0 km || 
|-id=657 bgcolor=#E9E9E9
| 36657 ||  || — || August 29, 2000 || Socorro || LINEAR || — || align=right | 2.8 km || 
|-id=658 bgcolor=#E9E9E9
| 36658 ||  || — || August 29, 2000 || Socorro || LINEAR || — || align=right | 3.7 km || 
|-id=659 bgcolor=#d6d6d6
| 36659 ||  || — || August 31, 2000 || Socorro || LINEAR || — || align=right | 5.6 km || 
|-id=660 bgcolor=#d6d6d6
| 36660 ||  || — || August 31, 2000 || Socorro || LINEAR || THM || align=right | 6.4 km || 
|-id=661 bgcolor=#E9E9E9
| 36661 ||  || — || August 31, 2000 || Socorro || LINEAR || — || align=right | 4.8 km || 
|-id=662 bgcolor=#E9E9E9
| 36662 ||  || — || August 31, 2000 || Socorro || LINEAR || — || align=right | 5.6 km || 
|-id=663 bgcolor=#d6d6d6
| 36663 ||  || — || August 31, 2000 || Socorro || LINEAR || — || align=right | 5.7 km || 
|-id=664 bgcolor=#E9E9E9
| 36664 ||  || — || August 31, 2000 || Socorro || LINEAR || — || align=right | 3.7 km || 
|-id=665 bgcolor=#E9E9E9
| 36665 ||  || — || August 31, 2000 || Socorro || LINEAR || — || align=right | 2.2 km || 
|-id=666 bgcolor=#E9E9E9
| 36666 ||  || — || August 31, 2000 || Socorro || LINEAR || — || align=right | 5.0 km || 
|-id=667 bgcolor=#fefefe
| 36667 ||  || — || August 31, 2000 || Socorro || LINEAR || MAS || align=right | 2.0 km || 
|-id=668 bgcolor=#E9E9E9
| 36668 ||  || — || August 31, 2000 || Socorro || LINEAR || GEF || align=right | 3.4 km || 
|-id=669 bgcolor=#d6d6d6
| 36669 ||  || — || August 31, 2000 || Socorro || LINEAR || — || align=right | 9.9 km || 
|-id=670 bgcolor=#d6d6d6
| 36670 ||  || — || August 31, 2000 || Socorro || LINEAR || — || align=right | 4.7 km || 
|-id=671 bgcolor=#d6d6d6
| 36671 ||  || — || August 31, 2000 || Socorro || LINEAR || — || align=right | 4.4 km || 
|-id=672 bgcolor=#E9E9E9
| 36672 Sidi ||  ||  || August 21, 2000 || Anderson Mesa || LONEOS || — || align=right | 3.8 km || 
|-id=673 bgcolor=#E9E9E9
| 36673 ||  || — || August 21, 2000 || Anderson Mesa || LONEOS || — || align=right | 6.4 km || 
|-id=674 bgcolor=#fefefe
| 36674 ||  || — || August 21, 2000 || Anderson Mesa || LONEOS || — || align=right | 1.9 km || 
|-id=675 bgcolor=#E9E9E9
| 36675 ||  || — || August 21, 2000 || Anderson Mesa || LONEOS || GEF || align=right | 3.5 km || 
|-id=676 bgcolor=#E9E9E9
| 36676 ||  || — || August 21, 2000 || Anderson Mesa || LONEOS || — || align=right | 6.8 km || 
|-id=677 bgcolor=#E9E9E9
| 36677 ||  || — || August 26, 2000 || Kitt Peak || Spacewatch || — || align=right | 4.2 km || 
|-id=678 bgcolor=#fefefe
| 36678 ||  || — || August 31, 2000 || Socorro || LINEAR || FLO || align=right | 1.5 km || 
|-id=679 bgcolor=#E9E9E9
| 36679 ||  || — || August 29, 2000 || Socorro || LINEAR || AGN || align=right | 2.9 km || 
|-id=680 bgcolor=#fefefe
| 36680 ||  || — || September 1, 2000 || Socorro || LINEAR || — || align=right | 2.0 km || 
|-id=681 bgcolor=#fefefe
| 36681 ||  || — || September 1, 2000 || Socorro || LINEAR || — || align=right | 5.7 km || 
|-id=682 bgcolor=#fefefe
| 36682 ||  || — || September 1, 2000 || Socorro || LINEAR || — || align=right | 7.7 km || 
|-id=683 bgcolor=#E9E9E9
| 36683 ||  || — || September 1, 2000 || Socorro || LINEAR || — || align=right | 1.8 km || 
|-id=684 bgcolor=#E9E9E9
| 36684 ||  || — || September 1, 2000 || Socorro || LINEAR || — || align=right | 2.0 km || 
|-id=685 bgcolor=#E9E9E9
| 36685 ||  || — || September 1, 2000 || Socorro || LINEAR || — || align=right | 5.1 km || 
|-id=686 bgcolor=#fefefe
| 36686 ||  || — || September 1, 2000 || Socorro || LINEAR || V || align=right | 4.6 km || 
|-id=687 bgcolor=#fefefe
| 36687 ||  || — || September 1, 2000 || Socorro || LINEAR || — || align=right | 2.5 km || 
|-id=688 bgcolor=#d6d6d6
| 36688 ||  || — || September 1, 2000 || Socorro || LINEAR || — || align=right | 5.6 km || 
|-id=689 bgcolor=#fefefe
| 36689 ||  || — || September 1, 2000 || Socorro || LINEAR || — || align=right | 3.1 km || 
|-id=690 bgcolor=#E9E9E9
| 36690 ||  || — || September 1, 2000 || Socorro || LINEAR || — || align=right | 6.9 km || 
|-id=691 bgcolor=#fefefe
| 36691 ||  || — || September 1, 2000 || Socorro || LINEAR || — || align=right | 2.9 km || 
|-id=692 bgcolor=#E9E9E9
| 36692 ||  || — || September 1, 2000 || Socorro || LINEAR || — || align=right | 3.3 km || 
|-id=693 bgcolor=#E9E9E9
| 36693 ||  || — || September 1, 2000 || Socorro || LINEAR || GEF || align=right | 2.8 km || 
|-id=694 bgcolor=#d6d6d6
| 36694 ||  || — || September 1, 2000 || Socorro || LINEAR || EOS || align=right | 5.7 km || 
|-id=695 bgcolor=#fefefe
| 36695 ||  || — || September 1, 2000 || Socorro || LINEAR || — || align=right | 2.4 km || 
|-id=696 bgcolor=#fefefe
| 36696 ||  || — || September 1, 2000 || Socorro || LINEAR || V || align=right | 2.6 km || 
|-id=697 bgcolor=#d6d6d6
| 36697 ||  || — || September 1, 2000 || Socorro || LINEAR || — || align=right | 8.3 km || 
|-id=698 bgcolor=#fefefe
| 36698 ||  || — || September 1, 2000 || Socorro || LINEAR || V || align=right | 1.6 km || 
|-id=699 bgcolor=#E9E9E9
| 36699 ||  || — || September 1, 2000 || Socorro || LINEAR || — || align=right | 6.3 km || 
|-id=700 bgcolor=#fefefe
| 36700 ||  || — || September 1, 2000 || Socorro || LINEAR || — || align=right | 3.0 km || 
|}

36701–36800 

|-bgcolor=#E9E9E9
| 36701 ||  || — || September 1, 2000 || Socorro || LINEAR || — || align=right | 4.6 km || 
|-id=702 bgcolor=#E9E9E9
| 36702 ||  || — || September 1, 2000 || Socorro || LINEAR || — || align=right | 3.2 km || 
|-id=703 bgcolor=#E9E9E9
| 36703 ||  || — || September 1, 2000 || Socorro || LINEAR || — || align=right | 6.0 km || 
|-id=704 bgcolor=#E9E9E9
| 36704 ||  || — || September 1, 2000 || Socorro || LINEAR || — || align=right | 3.3 km || 
|-id=705 bgcolor=#E9E9E9
| 36705 ||  || — || September 1, 2000 || Socorro || LINEAR || EUN || align=right | 4.4 km || 
|-id=706 bgcolor=#E9E9E9
| 36706 ||  || — || September 1, 2000 || Socorro || LINEAR || — || align=right | 4.3 km || 
|-id=707 bgcolor=#E9E9E9
| 36707 ||  || — || September 1, 2000 || Socorro || LINEAR || — || align=right | 8.7 km || 
|-id=708 bgcolor=#fefefe
| 36708 ||  || — || September 1, 2000 || Socorro || LINEAR || V || align=right | 2.4 km || 
|-id=709 bgcolor=#E9E9E9
| 36709 ||  || — || September 1, 2000 || Socorro || LINEAR || GEF || align=right | 3.7 km || 
|-id=710 bgcolor=#E9E9E9
| 36710 ||  || — || September 1, 2000 || Socorro || LINEAR || — || align=right | 3.5 km || 
|-id=711 bgcolor=#fefefe
| 36711 ||  || — || September 1, 2000 || Socorro || LINEAR || — || align=right | 2.3 km || 
|-id=712 bgcolor=#fefefe
| 36712 ||  || — || September 1, 2000 || Socorro || LINEAR || V || align=right | 2.7 km || 
|-id=713 bgcolor=#d6d6d6
| 36713 ||  || — || September 1, 2000 || Socorro || LINEAR || slow || align=right | 7.3 km || 
|-id=714 bgcolor=#E9E9E9
| 36714 ||  || — || September 1, 2000 || Socorro || LINEAR || — || align=right | 5.6 km || 
|-id=715 bgcolor=#fefefe
| 36715 ||  || — || September 6, 2000 || Elmira || A. J. Cecce || FLO || align=right | 2.4 km || 
|-id=716 bgcolor=#E9E9E9
| 36716 ||  || — || September 2, 2000 || Socorro || LINEAR || — || align=right | 2.6 km || 
|-id=717 bgcolor=#E9E9E9
| 36717 ||  || — || September 3, 2000 || Socorro || LINEAR || — || align=right | 3.0 km || 
|-id=718 bgcolor=#d6d6d6
| 36718 ||  || — || September 3, 2000 || Socorro || LINEAR || — || align=right | 12 km || 
|-id=719 bgcolor=#E9E9E9
| 36719 ||  || — || September 3, 2000 || Socorro || LINEAR || MAR || align=right | 4.7 km || 
|-id=720 bgcolor=#E9E9E9
| 36720 ||  || — || September 3, 2000 || Socorro || LINEAR || — || align=right | 3.5 km || 
|-id=721 bgcolor=#d6d6d6
| 36721 ||  || — || September 3, 2000 || Socorro || LINEAR || — || align=right | 10 km || 
|-id=722 bgcolor=#E9E9E9
| 36722 ||  || — || September 3, 2000 || Socorro || LINEAR || — || align=right | 3.2 km || 
|-id=723 bgcolor=#fefefe
| 36723 ||  || — || September 3, 2000 || Socorro || LINEAR || V || align=right | 1.9 km || 
|-id=724 bgcolor=#d6d6d6
| 36724 ||  || — || September 3, 2000 || Socorro || LINEAR || MEL || align=right | 12 km || 
|-id=725 bgcolor=#E9E9E9
| 36725 ||  || — || September 3, 2000 || Socorro || LINEAR || — || align=right | 4.3 km || 
|-id=726 bgcolor=#d6d6d6
| 36726 ||  || — || September 3, 2000 || Socorro || LINEAR || — || align=right | 10 km || 
|-id=727 bgcolor=#E9E9E9
| 36727 ||  || — || September 3, 2000 || Socorro || LINEAR || EUN || align=right | 3.7 km || 
|-id=728 bgcolor=#d6d6d6
| 36728 ||  || — || September 3, 2000 || Socorro || LINEAR || — || align=right | 8.3 km || 
|-id=729 bgcolor=#E9E9E9
| 36729 ||  || — || September 3, 2000 || Socorro || LINEAR || — || align=right | 3.2 km || 
|-id=730 bgcolor=#d6d6d6
| 36730 ||  || — || September 3, 2000 || Socorro || LINEAR || — || align=right | 10 km || 
|-id=731 bgcolor=#fefefe
| 36731 ||  || — || September 5, 2000 || Socorro || LINEAR || FLO || align=right | 4.1 km || 
|-id=732 bgcolor=#fefefe
| 36732 ||  || — || September 5, 2000 || Socorro || LINEAR || NYS || align=right | 2.2 km || 
|-id=733 bgcolor=#d6d6d6
| 36733 ||  || — || September 5, 2000 || Socorro || LINEAR || HYG || align=right | 8.0 km || 
|-id=734 bgcolor=#fefefe
| 36734 ||  || — || September 3, 2000 || Socorro || LINEAR || — || align=right | 3.6 km || 
|-id=735 bgcolor=#d6d6d6
| 36735 ||  || — || September 3, 2000 || Socorro || LINEAR || — || align=right | 18 km || 
|-id=736 bgcolor=#d6d6d6
| 36736 ||  || — || September 7, 2000 || Kitt Peak || Spacewatch || — || align=right | 5.8 km || 
|-id=737 bgcolor=#E9E9E9
| 36737 ||  || — || September 3, 2000 || Socorro || LINEAR || — || align=right | 4.2 km || 
|-id=738 bgcolor=#fefefe
| 36738 ||  || — || September 1, 2000 || Socorro || LINEAR || — || align=right | 3.5 km || 
|-id=739 bgcolor=#d6d6d6
| 36739 ||  || — || September 1, 2000 || Socorro || LINEAR || — || align=right | 8.0 km || 
|-id=740 bgcolor=#fefefe
| 36740 ||  || — || September 1, 2000 || Socorro || LINEAR || — || align=right | 3.2 km || 
|-id=741 bgcolor=#d6d6d6
| 36741 ||  || — || September 1, 2000 || Socorro || LINEAR || ALA || align=right | 14 km || 
|-id=742 bgcolor=#d6d6d6
| 36742 ||  || — || September 1, 2000 || Socorro || LINEAR || THM || align=right | 7.9 km || 
|-id=743 bgcolor=#d6d6d6
| 36743 ||  || — || September 1, 2000 || Socorro || LINEAR || 628 || align=right | 6.2 km || 
|-id=744 bgcolor=#fefefe
| 36744 ||  || — || September 2, 2000 || Socorro || LINEAR || FLO || align=right | 1.8 km || 
|-id=745 bgcolor=#E9E9E9
| 36745 ||  || — || September 3, 2000 || Socorro || LINEAR || RAF || align=right | 3.7 km || 
|-id=746 bgcolor=#fefefe
| 36746 ||  || — || September 1, 2000 || Socorro || LINEAR || — || align=right | 1.9 km || 
|-id=747 bgcolor=#E9E9E9
| 36747 ||  || — || September 1, 2000 || Socorro || LINEAR || — || align=right | 2.6 km || 
|-id=748 bgcolor=#E9E9E9
| 36748 ||  || — || September 1, 2000 || Socorro || LINEAR || — || align=right | 8.7 km || 
|-id=749 bgcolor=#fefefe
| 36749 ||  || — || September 1, 2000 || Socorro || LINEAR || FLO || align=right | 2.5 km || 
|-id=750 bgcolor=#fefefe
| 36750 ||  || — || September 2, 2000 || Socorro || LINEAR || — || align=right | 4.6 km || 
|-id=751 bgcolor=#fefefe
| 36751 ||  || — || September 2, 2000 || Socorro || LINEAR || — || align=right | 1.9 km || 
|-id=752 bgcolor=#E9E9E9
| 36752 ||  || — || September 2, 2000 || Socorro || LINEAR || — || align=right | 6.4 km || 
|-id=753 bgcolor=#fefefe
| 36753 ||  || — || September 2, 2000 || Socorro || LINEAR || FLO || align=right | 2.6 km || 
|-id=754 bgcolor=#E9E9E9
| 36754 ||  || — || September 2, 2000 || Socorro || LINEAR || — || align=right | 5.8 km || 
|-id=755 bgcolor=#fefefe
| 36755 ||  || — || September 2, 2000 || Socorro || LINEAR || NYS || align=right | 2.5 km || 
|-id=756 bgcolor=#fefefe
| 36756 ||  || — || September 2, 2000 || Socorro || LINEAR || FLO || align=right | 2.5 km || 
|-id=757 bgcolor=#fefefe
| 36757 ||  || — || September 2, 2000 || Socorro || LINEAR || V || align=right | 3.4 km || 
|-id=758 bgcolor=#fefefe
| 36758 ||  || — || September 2, 2000 || Socorro || LINEAR || FLO || align=right | 3.0 km || 
|-id=759 bgcolor=#fefefe
| 36759 ||  || — || September 3, 2000 || Socorro || LINEAR || — || align=right | 5.9 km || 
|-id=760 bgcolor=#d6d6d6
| 36760 ||  || — || September 4, 2000 || Socorro || LINEAR || KOR || align=right | 5.1 km || 
|-id=761 bgcolor=#fefefe
| 36761 ||  || — || September 4, 2000 || Socorro || LINEAR || V || align=right | 3.4 km || 
|-id=762 bgcolor=#d6d6d6
| 36762 ||  || — || September 10, 2000 || Višnjan Observatory || K. Korlević || — || align=right | 7.6 km || 
|-id=763 bgcolor=#fefefe
| 36763 ||  || — || September 1, 2000 || Socorro || LINEAR || — || align=right | 3.0 km || 
|-id=764 bgcolor=#fefefe
| 36764 ||  || — || September 1, 2000 || Socorro || LINEAR || NYS || align=right | 5.8 km || 
|-id=765 bgcolor=#E9E9E9
| 36765 ||  || — || September 2, 2000 || Socorro || LINEAR || — || align=right | 6.2 km || 
|-id=766 bgcolor=#fefefe
| 36766 ||  || — || September 3, 2000 || Socorro || LINEAR || — || align=right | 2.4 km || 
|-id=767 bgcolor=#fefefe
| 36767 ||  || — || September 3, 2000 || Socorro || LINEAR || — || align=right | 2.3 km || 
|-id=768 bgcolor=#E9E9E9
| 36768 ||  || — || September 3, 2000 || Socorro || LINEAR || — || align=right | 6.5 km || 
|-id=769 bgcolor=#E9E9E9
| 36769 ||  || — || September 4, 2000 || Anderson Mesa || LONEOS || — || align=right | 3.2 km || 
|-id=770 bgcolor=#fefefe
| 36770 ||  || — || September 4, 2000 || Anderson Mesa || LONEOS || — || align=right | 3.6 km || 
|-id=771 bgcolor=#FA8072
| 36771 ||  || — || September 5, 2000 || Anderson Mesa || LONEOS || H || align=right | 5.6 km || 
|-id=772 bgcolor=#d6d6d6
| 36772 ||  || — || September 5, 2000 || Anderson Mesa || LONEOS || — || align=right | 19 km || 
|-id=773 bgcolor=#E9E9E9
| 36773 Tuttlekeane ||  ||  || September 5, 2000 || Anderson Mesa || LONEOS || INO || align=right | 2.9 km || 
|-id=774 bgcolor=#E9E9E9
| 36774 Kuittinen ||  ||  || September 5, 2000 || Anderson Mesa || LONEOS || — || align=right | 6.9 km || 
|-id=775 bgcolor=#d6d6d6
| 36775 ||  || — || September 5, 2000 || Anderson Mesa || LONEOS || — || align=right | 12 km || 
|-id=776 bgcolor=#d6d6d6
| 36776 ||  || — || September 5, 2000 || Anderson Mesa || LONEOS || — || align=right | 8.4 km || 
|-id=777 bgcolor=#E9E9E9
| 36777 ||  || — || September 6, 2000 || Socorro || LINEAR || EUN || align=right | 4.5 km || 
|-id=778 bgcolor=#fefefe
| 36778 ||  || — || September 19, 2000 || Kvistaberg || UDAS || — || align=right | 7.1 km || 
|-id=779 bgcolor=#FA8072
| 36779 ||  || — || September 20, 2000 || Socorro || LINEAR || — || align=right | 2.1 km || 
|-id=780 bgcolor=#E9E9E9
| 36780 ||  || — || September 20, 2000 || Socorro || LINEAR || — || align=right | 12 km || 
|-id=781 bgcolor=#fefefe
| 36781 ||  || — || September 30, 2000 || Socorro || LINEAR || V || align=right | 1.9 km || 
|-id=782 bgcolor=#E9E9E9
| 36782 Okauchitakashige ||  ||  || September 20, 2000 || Bisei SG Center || BATTeRS || — || align=right | 7.4 km || 
|-id=783 bgcolor=#fefefe
| 36783 Kagamino ||  ||  || September 23, 2000 || Bisei SG Center || BATTeRS || — || align=right | 3.0 km || 
|-id=784 bgcolor=#fefefe
| 36784 ||  || — || September 20, 2000 || Socorro || LINEAR || NYS || align=right | 2.8 km || 
|-id=785 bgcolor=#d6d6d6
| 36785 ||  || — || September 20, 2000 || Socorro || LINEAR || HYG || align=right | 7.9 km || 
|-id=786 bgcolor=#E9E9E9
| 36786 ||  || — || September 23, 2000 || Socorro || LINEAR || — || align=right | 3.9 km || 
|-id=787 bgcolor=#fefefe
| 36787 ||  || — || September 23, 2000 || Socorro || LINEAR || FLO || align=right | 1.6 km || 
|-id=788 bgcolor=#d6d6d6
| 36788 ||  || — || September 23, 2000 || Socorro || LINEAR || — || align=right | 5.7 km || 
|-id=789 bgcolor=#fefefe
| 36789 ||  || — || September 23, 2000 || Socorro || LINEAR || — || align=right | 4.0 km || 
|-id=790 bgcolor=#d6d6d6
| 36790 ||  || — || September 23, 2000 || Socorro || LINEAR || — || align=right | 8.9 km || 
|-id=791 bgcolor=#E9E9E9
| 36791 ||  || — || September 20, 2000 || Haleakala || NEAT || — || align=right | 3.9 km || 
|-id=792 bgcolor=#E9E9E9
| 36792 ||  || — || September 25, 2000 || Višnjan Observatory || K. Korlević || MAR || align=right | 4.4 km || 
|-id=793 bgcolor=#fefefe
| 36793 ||  || — || September 24, 2000 || Socorro || LINEAR || FLO || align=right | 1.7 km || 
|-id=794 bgcolor=#d6d6d6
| 36794 ||  || — || September 24, 2000 || Socorro || LINEAR || — || align=right | 5.7 km || 
|-id=795 bgcolor=#fefefe
| 36795 ||  || — || September 24, 2000 || Socorro || LINEAR || — || align=right | 1.8 km || 
|-id=796 bgcolor=#fefefe
| 36796 ||  || — || September 24, 2000 || Socorro || LINEAR || — || align=right | 6.0 km || 
|-id=797 bgcolor=#d6d6d6
| 36797 ||  || — || September 25, 2000 || Višnjan Observatory || K. Korlević || THM || align=right | 8.4 km || 
|-id=798 bgcolor=#fefefe
| 36798 ||  || — || September 25, 2000 || Črni Vrh || Črni Vrh || — || align=right | 1.6 km || 
|-id=799 bgcolor=#fefefe
| 36799 ||  || — || September 26, 2000 || Črni Vrh || Črni Vrh || FLO || align=right | 1.9 km || 
|-id=800 bgcolor=#fefefe
| 36800 Katarinawitt ||  ||  || September 28, 2000 || Drebach || J. Kandler || — || align=right | 2.5 km || 
|}

36801–36900 

|-bgcolor=#E9E9E9
| 36801 ||  || — || September 23, 2000 || Socorro || LINEAR || — || align=right | 4.2 km || 
|-id=802 bgcolor=#fefefe
| 36802 ||  || — || September 24, 2000 || Socorro || LINEAR || — || align=right | 4.1 km || 
|-id=803 bgcolor=#E9E9E9
| 36803 ||  || — || September 24, 2000 || Socorro || LINEAR || — || align=right | 3.9 km || 
|-id=804 bgcolor=#E9E9E9
| 36804 ||  || — || September 24, 2000 || Socorro || LINEAR || — || align=right | 3.1 km || 
|-id=805 bgcolor=#d6d6d6
| 36805 ||  || — || September 24, 2000 || Socorro || LINEAR || — || align=right | 5.1 km || 
|-id=806 bgcolor=#d6d6d6
| 36806 ||  || — || September 24, 2000 || Socorro || LINEAR || — || align=right | 3.1 km || 
|-id=807 bgcolor=#E9E9E9
| 36807 ||  || — || September 24, 2000 || Socorro || LINEAR || — || align=right | 2.4 km || 
|-id=808 bgcolor=#fefefe
| 36808 ||  || — || September 24, 2000 || Socorro || LINEAR || — || align=right | 1.9 km || 
|-id=809 bgcolor=#fefefe
| 36809 ||  || — || September 24, 2000 || Socorro || LINEAR || — || align=right | 2.2 km || 
|-id=810 bgcolor=#E9E9E9
| 36810 ||  || — || September 24, 2000 || Socorro || LINEAR || — || align=right | 2.8 km || 
|-id=811 bgcolor=#fefefe
| 36811 ||  || — || September 24, 2000 || Socorro || LINEAR || V || align=right | 1.8 km || 
|-id=812 bgcolor=#fefefe
| 36812 ||  || — || September 24, 2000 || Socorro || LINEAR || — || align=right | 2.3 km || 
|-id=813 bgcolor=#d6d6d6
| 36813 ||  || — || September 24, 2000 || Socorro || LINEAR || — || align=right | 8.7 km || 
|-id=814 bgcolor=#d6d6d6
| 36814 ||  || — || September 24, 2000 || Socorro || LINEAR || — || align=right | 7.3 km || 
|-id=815 bgcolor=#E9E9E9
| 36815 ||  || — || September 24, 2000 || Socorro || LINEAR || WIT || align=right | 2.3 km || 
|-id=816 bgcolor=#E9E9E9
| 36816 ||  || — || September 24, 2000 || Socorro || LINEAR || CLO || align=right | 5.2 km || 
|-id=817 bgcolor=#fefefe
| 36817 ||  || — || September 24, 2000 || Socorro || LINEAR || V || align=right | 2.4 km || 
|-id=818 bgcolor=#d6d6d6
| 36818 ||  || — || September 24, 2000 || Socorro || LINEAR || THM || align=right | 5.1 km || 
|-id=819 bgcolor=#E9E9E9
| 36819 ||  || — || September 24, 2000 || Socorro || LINEAR || — || align=right | 6.8 km || 
|-id=820 bgcolor=#E9E9E9
| 36820 ||  || — || September 24, 2000 || Socorro || LINEAR || — || align=right | 5.2 km || 
|-id=821 bgcolor=#d6d6d6
| 36821 ||  || — || September 24, 2000 || Socorro || LINEAR || — || align=right | 6.6 km || 
|-id=822 bgcolor=#E9E9E9
| 36822 ||  || — || September 24, 2000 || Socorro || LINEAR || — || align=right | 3.1 km || 
|-id=823 bgcolor=#fefefe
| 36823 ||  || — || September 24, 2000 || Socorro || LINEAR || V || align=right | 2.0 km || 
|-id=824 bgcolor=#d6d6d6
| 36824 ||  || — || September 24, 2000 || Socorro || LINEAR || LAU || align=right | 7.6 km || 
|-id=825 bgcolor=#fefefe
| 36825 ||  || — || September 24, 2000 || Socorro || LINEAR || — || align=right | 2.2 km || 
|-id=826 bgcolor=#E9E9E9
| 36826 ||  || — || September 24, 2000 || Socorro || LINEAR || — || align=right | 6.8 km || 
|-id=827 bgcolor=#d6d6d6
| 36827 ||  || — || September 22, 2000 || Elmira || A. J. Cecce || — || align=right | 11 km || 
|-id=828 bgcolor=#d6d6d6
| 36828 ||  || — || September 23, 2000 || Socorro || LINEAR || — || align=right | 8.3 km || 
|-id=829 bgcolor=#d6d6d6
| 36829 ||  || — || September 23, 2000 || Socorro || LINEAR || — || align=right | 6.1 km || 
|-id=830 bgcolor=#E9E9E9
| 36830 ||  || — || September 23, 2000 || Socorro || LINEAR || — || align=right | 12 km || 
|-id=831 bgcolor=#E9E9E9
| 36831 ||  || — || September 23, 2000 || Socorro || LINEAR || — || align=right | 3.4 km || 
|-id=832 bgcolor=#E9E9E9
| 36832 ||  || — || September 24, 2000 || Socorro || LINEAR || — || align=right | 6.9 km || 
|-id=833 bgcolor=#d6d6d6
| 36833 ||  || — || September 24, 2000 || Socorro || LINEAR || — || align=right | 7.7 km || 
|-id=834 bgcolor=#fefefe
| 36834 ||  || — || September 24, 2000 || Socorro || LINEAR || V || align=right | 2.7 km || 
|-id=835 bgcolor=#E9E9E9
| 36835 ||  || — || September 24, 2000 || Socorro || LINEAR || — || align=right | 5.1 km || 
|-id=836 bgcolor=#E9E9E9
| 36836 ||  || — || September 24, 2000 || Socorro || LINEAR || — || align=right | 2.7 km || 
|-id=837 bgcolor=#d6d6d6
| 36837 ||  || — || September 24, 2000 || Socorro || LINEAR || KOR || align=right | 3.6 km || 
|-id=838 bgcolor=#d6d6d6
| 36838 ||  || — || September 24, 2000 || Socorro || LINEAR || KOR || align=right | 3.7 km || 
|-id=839 bgcolor=#E9E9E9
| 36839 ||  || — || September 24, 2000 || Socorro || LINEAR || — || align=right | 2.8 km || 
|-id=840 bgcolor=#E9E9E9
| 36840 ||  || — || September 24, 2000 || Socorro || LINEAR || — || align=right | 2.6 km || 
|-id=841 bgcolor=#d6d6d6
| 36841 ||  || — || September 24, 2000 || Socorro || LINEAR || THM || align=right | 6.3 km || 
|-id=842 bgcolor=#d6d6d6
| 36842 ||  || — || September 24, 2000 || Socorro || LINEAR || — || align=right | 4.7 km || 
|-id=843 bgcolor=#E9E9E9
| 36843 ||  || — || September 24, 2000 || Socorro || LINEAR || — || align=right | 3.8 km || 
|-id=844 bgcolor=#E9E9E9
| 36844 ||  || — || September 24, 2000 || Socorro || LINEAR || — || align=right | 7.5 km || 
|-id=845 bgcolor=#fefefe
| 36845 ||  || — || September 24, 2000 || Socorro || LINEAR || FLO || align=right | 7.8 km || 
|-id=846 bgcolor=#E9E9E9
| 36846 ||  || — || September 24, 2000 || Socorro || LINEAR || MRX || align=right | 3.8 km || 
|-id=847 bgcolor=#E9E9E9
| 36847 ||  || — || September 24, 2000 || Socorro || LINEAR || — || align=right | 3.5 km || 
|-id=848 bgcolor=#fefefe
| 36848 ||  || — || September 24, 2000 || Socorro || LINEAR || — || align=right | 5.6 km || 
|-id=849 bgcolor=#E9E9E9
| 36849 ||  || — || September 24, 2000 || Socorro || LINEAR || — || align=right | 5.9 km || 
|-id=850 bgcolor=#d6d6d6
| 36850 ||  || — || September 24, 2000 || Socorro || LINEAR || KOR || align=right | 3.8 km || 
|-id=851 bgcolor=#E9E9E9
| 36851 ||  || — || September 24, 2000 || Socorro || LINEAR || — || align=right | 2.8 km || 
|-id=852 bgcolor=#d6d6d6
| 36852 ||  || — || September 24, 2000 || Socorro || LINEAR || — || align=right | 9.2 km || 
|-id=853 bgcolor=#E9E9E9
| 36853 ||  || — || September 24, 2000 || Socorro || LINEAR || — || align=right | 2.9 km || 
|-id=854 bgcolor=#E9E9E9
| 36854 ||  || — || September 24, 2000 || Socorro || LINEAR || PAD || align=right | 6.7 km || 
|-id=855 bgcolor=#fefefe
| 36855 ||  || — || September 24, 2000 || Socorro || LINEAR || — || align=right | 3.1 km || 
|-id=856 bgcolor=#E9E9E9
| 36856 ||  || — || September 24, 2000 || Socorro || LINEAR || — || align=right | 3.6 km || 
|-id=857 bgcolor=#fefefe
| 36857 ||  || — || September 24, 2000 || Socorro || LINEAR || ERI || align=right | 5.3 km || 
|-id=858 bgcolor=#fefefe
| 36858 ||  || — || September 24, 2000 || Socorro || LINEAR || — || align=right | 2.2 km || 
|-id=859 bgcolor=#E9E9E9
| 36859 ||  || — || September 23, 2000 || Socorro || LINEAR || — || align=right | 7.4 km || 
|-id=860 bgcolor=#E9E9E9
| 36860 ||  || — || September 23, 2000 || Socorro || LINEAR || — || align=right | 3.1 km || 
|-id=861 bgcolor=#d6d6d6
| 36861 ||  || — || September 23, 2000 || Socorro || LINEAR || — || align=right | 9.2 km || 
|-id=862 bgcolor=#E9E9E9
| 36862 ||  || — || September 23, 2000 || Socorro || LINEAR || — || align=right | 5.3 km || 
|-id=863 bgcolor=#E9E9E9
| 36863 ||  || — || September 23, 2000 || Socorro || LINEAR || — || align=right | 6.7 km || 
|-id=864 bgcolor=#fefefe
| 36864 ||  || — || September 24, 2000 || Socorro || LINEAR || — || align=right | 3.5 km || 
|-id=865 bgcolor=#fefefe
| 36865 ||  || — || September 24, 2000 || Socorro || LINEAR || — || align=right | 2.4 km || 
|-id=866 bgcolor=#E9E9E9
| 36866 ||  || — || September 24, 2000 || Socorro || LINEAR || — || align=right | 2.1 km || 
|-id=867 bgcolor=#d6d6d6
| 36867 ||  || — || September 24, 2000 || Socorro || LINEAR || — || align=right | 5.4 km || 
|-id=868 bgcolor=#fefefe
| 36868 ||  || — || September 24, 2000 || Socorro || LINEAR || NYS || align=right | 4.9 km || 
|-id=869 bgcolor=#E9E9E9
| 36869 ||  || — || September 24, 2000 || Socorro || LINEAR || HEN || align=right | 2.3 km || 
|-id=870 bgcolor=#fefefe
| 36870 ||  || — || September 24, 2000 || Socorro || LINEAR || NYS || align=right | 5.9 km || 
|-id=871 bgcolor=#fefefe
| 36871 ||  || — || September 24, 2000 || Socorro || LINEAR || — || align=right | 2.9 km || 
|-id=872 bgcolor=#fefefe
| 36872 ||  || — || September 24, 2000 || Socorro || LINEAR || — || align=right | 2.1 km || 
|-id=873 bgcolor=#d6d6d6
| 36873 ||  || — || September 24, 2000 || Socorro || LINEAR || KOR || align=right | 3.5 km || 
|-id=874 bgcolor=#E9E9E9
| 36874 ||  || — || September 24, 2000 || Socorro || LINEAR || — || align=right | 3.7 km || 
|-id=875 bgcolor=#E9E9E9
| 36875 ||  || — || September 24, 2000 || Socorro || LINEAR || — || align=right | 3.7 km || 
|-id=876 bgcolor=#d6d6d6
| 36876 ||  || — || September 24, 2000 || Socorro || LINEAR || THM || align=right | 9.1 km || 
|-id=877 bgcolor=#E9E9E9
| 36877 ||  || — || September 24, 2000 || Socorro || LINEAR || — || align=right | 2.8 km || 
|-id=878 bgcolor=#d6d6d6
| 36878 ||  || — || September 24, 2000 || Socorro || LINEAR || HYG || align=right | 11 km || 
|-id=879 bgcolor=#d6d6d6
| 36879 ||  || — || September 24, 2000 || Socorro || LINEAR || — || align=right | 7.6 km || 
|-id=880 bgcolor=#E9E9E9
| 36880 ||  || — || September 24, 2000 || Socorro || LINEAR || — || align=right | 6.6 km || 
|-id=881 bgcolor=#fefefe
| 36881 ||  || — || September 24, 2000 || Socorro || LINEAR || — || align=right | 3.7 km || 
|-id=882 bgcolor=#d6d6d6
| 36882 ||  || — || September 24, 2000 || Socorro || LINEAR || — || align=right | 9.3 km || 
|-id=883 bgcolor=#E9E9E9
| 36883 ||  || — || September 24, 2000 || Socorro || LINEAR || — || align=right | 5.6 km || 
|-id=884 bgcolor=#d6d6d6
| 36884 ||  || — || September 27, 2000 || Socorro || LINEAR || KOR || align=right | 3.6 km || 
|-id=885 bgcolor=#E9E9E9
| 36885 ||  || — || September 27, 2000 || Kitt Peak || Spacewatch || — || align=right | 2.7 km || 
|-id=886 bgcolor=#d6d6d6
| 36886 ||  || — || September 20, 2000 || Haleakala || NEAT || — || align=right | 5.8 km || 
|-id=887 bgcolor=#d6d6d6
| 36887 ||  || — || September 20, 2000 || Haleakala || NEAT || — || align=right | 5.0 km || 
|-id=888 bgcolor=#fefefe
| 36888 Škrabal ||  ||  || September 29, 2000 || Ondřejov || P. Kušnirák, P. Pravec || — || align=right | 1.9 km || 
|-id=889 bgcolor=#d6d6d6
| 36889 ||  || — || September 23, 2000 || Socorro || LINEAR || — || align=right | 6.5 km || 
|-id=890 bgcolor=#E9E9E9
| 36890 ||  || — || September 23, 2000 || Socorro || LINEAR || MAR || align=right | 3.1 km || 
|-id=891 bgcolor=#d6d6d6
| 36891 ||  || — || September 23, 2000 || Socorro || LINEAR || — || align=right | 5.2 km || 
|-id=892 bgcolor=#fefefe
| 36892 ||  || — || September 23, 2000 || Socorro || LINEAR || — || align=right | 2.6 km || 
|-id=893 bgcolor=#E9E9E9
| 36893 ||  || — || September 24, 2000 || Socorro || LINEAR || — || align=right | 3.1 km || 
|-id=894 bgcolor=#E9E9E9
| 36894 ||  || — || September 24, 2000 || Socorro || LINEAR || — || align=right | 6.2 km || 
|-id=895 bgcolor=#d6d6d6
| 36895 ||  || — || September 24, 2000 || Socorro || LINEAR || EOS || align=right | 5.9 km || 
|-id=896 bgcolor=#d6d6d6
| 36896 ||  || — || September 25, 2000 || Socorro || LINEAR || EOS || align=right | 4.7 km || 
|-id=897 bgcolor=#E9E9E9
| 36897 ||  || — || September 27, 2000 || Socorro || LINEAR || MAR || align=right | 6.2 km || 
|-id=898 bgcolor=#d6d6d6
| 36898 ||  || — || September 27, 2000 || Socorro || LINEAR || — || align=right | 9.5 km || 
|-id=899 bgcolor=#fefefe
| 36899 ||  || — || September 27, 2000 || Socorro || LINEAR || FLO || align=right | 2.7 km || 
|-id=900 bgcolor=#d6d6d6
| 36900 ||  || — || September 28, 2000 || Socorro || LINEAR || EOS || align=right | 5.0 km || 
|}

36901–37000 

|-bgcolor=#fefefe
| 36901 ||  || — || September 28, 2000 || Socorro || LINEAR || — || align=right | 2.8 km || 
|-id=902 bgcolor=#E9E9E9
| 36902 ||  || — || September 28, 2000 || Socorro || LINEAR || WIT || align=right | 3.4 km || 
|-id=903 bgcolor=#E9E9E9
| 36903 ||  || — || September 28, 2000 || Socorro || LINEAR || — || align=right | 4.2 km || 
|-id=904 bgcolor=#E9E9E9
| 36904 ||  || — || September 28, 2000 || Socorro || LINEAR || — || align=right | 3.5 km || 
|-id=905 bgcolor=#d6d6d6
| 36905 ||  || — || September 28, 2000 || Socorro || LINEAR || — || align=right | 5.2 km || 
|-id=906 bgcolor=#E9E9E9
| 36906 ||  || — || September 28, 2000 || Socorro || LINEAR || — || align=right | 4.3 km || 
|-id=907 bgcolor=#E9E9E9
| 36907 ||  || — || September 19, 2000 || Haleakala || NEAT || EUN || align=right | 3.6 km || 
|-id=908 bgcolor=#fefefe
| 36908 ||  || — || September 20, 2000 || Socorro || LINEAR || — || align=right | 2.6 km || 
|-id=909 bgcolor=#fefefe
| 36909 ||  || — || September 21, 2000 || Kitt Peak || Spacewatch || NYS || align=right | 2.1 km || 
|-id=910 bgcolor=#d6d6d6
| 36910 ||  || — || September 21, 2000 || Haleakala || NEAT || — || align=right | 5.6 km || 
|-id=911 bgcolor=#E9E9E9
| 36911 ||  || — || September 21, 2000 || Haleakala || NEAT || AGN || align=right | 2.8 km || 
|-id=912 bgcolor=#E9E9E9
| 36912 ||  || — || September 21, 2000 || Haleakala || NEAT || PAD || align=right | 4.9 km || 
|-id=913 bgcolor=#E9E9E9
| 36913 ||  || — || September 21, 2000 || Haleakala || NEAT || — || align=right | 2.8 km || 
|-id=914 bgcolor=#d6d6d6
| 36914 ||  || — || September 24, 2000 || Socorro || LINEAR || THM || align=right | 5.6 km || 
|-id=915 bgcolor=#fefefe
| 36915 ||  || — || September 24, 2000 || Socorro || LINEAR || — || align=right | 1.5 km || 
|-id=916 bgcolor=#fefefe
| 36916 ||  || — || September 24, 2000 || Socorro || LINEAR || NYS || align=right | 2.5 km || 
|-id=917 bgcolor=#E9E9E9
| 36917 ||  || — || September 24, 2000 || Socorro || LINEAR || AGN || align=right | 2.6 km || 
|-id=918 bgcolor=#fefefe
| 36918 ||  || — || September 24, 2000 || Socorro || LINEAR || — || align=right | 1.9 km || 
|-id=919 bgcolor=#fefefe
| 36919 ||  || — || September 24, 2000 || Socorro || LINEAR || MAS || align=right | 2.3 km || 
|-id=920 bgcolor=#d6d6d6
| 36920 ||  || — || September 24, 2000 || Socorro || LINEAR || THM || align=right | 6.6 km || 
|-id=921 bgcolor=#fefefe
| 36921 ||  || — || September 24, 2000 || Socorro || LINEAR || EUT || align=right | 1.8 km || 
|-id=922 bgcolor=#C2FFFF
| 36922 ||  || — || September 25, 2000 || Socorro || LINEAR || L5 || align=right | 18 km || 
|-id=923 bgcolor=#fefefe
| 36923 ||  || — || September 25, 2000 || Socorro || LINEAR || — || align=right | 2.3 km || 
|-id=924 bgcolor=#d6d6d6
| 36924 ||  || — || September 25, 2000 || Socorro || LINEAR || — || align=right | 9.0 km || 
|-id=925 bgcolor=#fefefe
| 36925 ||  || — || September 25, 2000 || Socorro || LINEAR || V || align=right | 4.0 km || 
|-id=926 bgcolor=#E9E9E9
| 36926 ||  || — || September 25, 2000 || Socorro || LINEAR || — || align=right | 3.7 km || 
|-id=927 bgcolor=#E9E9E9
| 36927 ||  || — || September 26, 2000 || Socorro || LINEAR || RAF || align=right | 3.3 km || 
|-id=928 bgcolor=#fefefe
| 36928 ||  || — || September 26, 2000 || Socorro || LINEAR || — || align=right | 2.1 km || 
|-id=929 bgcolor=#E9E9E9
| 36929 ||  || — || September 26, 2000 || Socorro || LINEAR || — || align=right | 4.0 km || 
|-id=930 bgcolor=#d6d6d6
| 36930 ||  || — || September 26, 2000 || Socorro || LINEAR || — || align=right | 5.2 km || 
|-id=931 bgcolor=#fefefe
| 36931 ||  || — || September 26, 2000 || Socorro || LINEAR || V || align=right | 2.8 km || 
|-id=932 bgcolor=#d6d6d6
| 36932 ||  || — || September 26, 2000 || Socorro || LINEAR || — || align=right | 7.8 km || 
|-id=933 bgcolor=#E9E9E9
| 36933 ||  || — || September 26, 2000 || Socorro || LINEAR || EUN || align=right | 3.2 km || 
|-id=934 bgcolor=#fefefe
| 36934 ||  || — || September 27, 2000 || Socorro || LINEAR || — || align=right | 2.7 km || 
|-id=935 bgcolor=#fefefe
| 36935 ||  || — || September 27, 2000 || Socorro || LINEAR || V || align=right | 2.3 km || 
|-id=936 bgcolor=#d6d6d6
| 36936 ||  || — || September 27, 2000 || Socorro || LINEAR || EOS || align=right | 7.3 km || 
|-id=937 bgcolor=#d6d6d6
| 36937 ||  || — || September 28, 2000 || Socorro || LINEAR || — || align=right | 4.8 km || 
|-id=938 bgcolor=#fefefe
| 36938 ||  || — || September 21, 2000 || Socorro || LINEAR || — || align=right | 2.1 km || 
|-id=939 bgcolor=#d6d6d6
| 36939 ||  || — || September 24, 2000 || Socorro || LINEAR || THM || align=right | 4.1 km || 
|-id=940 bgcolor=#fefefe
| 36940 ||  || — || September 26, 2000 || Socorro || LINEAR || — || align=right | 5.3 km || 
|-id=941 bgcolor=#d6d6d6
| 36941 ||  || — || September 28, 2000 || Socorro || LINEAR || 3:2 || align=right | 7.7 km || 
|-id=942 bgcolor=#fefefe
| 36942 ||  || — || September 24, 2000 || Socorro || LINEAR || — || align=right | 2.1 km || 
|-id=943 bgcolor=#fefefe
| 36943 ||  || — || September 24, 2000 || Socorro || LINEAR || — || align=right | 2.9 km || 
|-id=944 bgcolor=#E9E9E9
| 36944 ||  || — || September 24, 2000 || Socorro || LINEAR || — || align=right | 5.0 km || 
|-id=945 bgcolor=#d6d6d6
| 36945 ||  || — || September 24, 2000 || Socorro || LINEAR || CHA || align=right | 4.1 km || 
|-id=946 bgcolor=#d6d6d6
| 36946 ||  || — || September 24, 2000 || Socorro || LINEAR || — || align=right | 5.2 km || 
|-id=947 bgcolor=#fefefe
| 36947 ||  || — || September 24, 2000 || Socorro || LINEAR || — || align=right | 2.2 km || 
|-id=948 bgcolor=#fefefe
| 36948 ||  || — || September 24, 2000 || Socorro || LINEAR || NYS || align=right | 1.8 km || 
|-id=949 bgcolor=#E9E9E9
| 36949 ||  || — || September 24, 2000 || Socorro || LINEAR || — || align=right | 3.4 km || 
|-id=950 bgcolor=#d6d6d6
| 36950 ||  || — || September 24, 2000 || Socorro || LINEAR || — || align=right | 5.8 km || 
|-id=951 bgcolor=#E9E9E9
| 36951 ||  || — || September 24, 2000 || Socorro || LINEAR || — || align=right | 6.5 km || 
|-id=952 bgcolor=#E9E9E9
| 36952 ||  || — || September 26, 2000 || Socorro || LINEAR || — || align=right | 4.8 km || 
|-id=953 bgcolor=#d6d6d6
| 36953 ||  || — || September 27, 2000 || Socorro || LINEAR || KOR || align=right | 3.3 km || 
|-id=954 bgcolor=#d6d6d6
| 36954 ||  || — || September 27, 2000 || Socorro || LINEAR || — || align=right | 5.6 km || 
|-id=955 bgcolor=#E9E9E9
| 36955 ||  || — || September 27, 2000 || Socorro || LINEAR || — || align=right | 5.1 km || 
|-id=956 bgcolor=#d6d6d6
| 36956 ||  || — || September 28, 2000 || Socorro || LINEAR || — || align=right | 6.1 km || 
|-id=957 bgcolor=#E9E9E9
| 36957 ||  || — || September 28, 2000 || Socorro || LINEAR || — || align=right | 5.6 km || 
|-id=958 bgcolor=#d6d6d6
| 36958 ||  || — || September 30, 2000 || Socorro || LINEAR || — || align=right | 6.4 km || 
|-id=959 bgcolor=#d6d6d6
| 36959 ||  || — || September 25, 2000 || Socorro || LINEAR || — || align=right | 5.1 km || 
|-id=960 bgcolor=#E9E9E9
| 36960 ||  || — || September 25, 2000 || Socorro || LINEAR || MAR || align=right | 2.7 km || 
|-id=961 bgcolor=#fefefe
| 36961 ||  || — || September 30, 2000 || Socorro || LINEAR || — || align=right | 2.2 km || 
|-id=962 bgcolor=#E9E9E9
| 36962 ||  || — || September 30, 2000 || Socorro || LINEAR || — || align=right | 2.4 km || 
|-id=963 bgcolor=#fefefe
| 36963 ||  || — || September 23, 2000 || Socorro || LINEAR || — || align=right | 2.1 km || 
|-id=964 bgcolor=#E9E9E9
| 36964 ||  || — || September 26, 2000 || Socorro || LINEAR || MAR || align=right | 3.4 km || 
|-id=965 bgcolor=#E9E9E9
| 36965 ||  || — || September 27, 2000 || Socorro || LINEAR || — || align=right | 4.0 km || 
|-id=966 bgcolor=#fefefe
| 36966 ||  || — || September 27, 2000 || Socorro || LINEAR || FLO || align=right | 2.1 km || 
|-id=967 bgcolor=#d6d6d6
| 36967 ||  || — || September 27, 2000 || Socorro || LINEAR || EOS || align=right | 6.3 km || 
|-id=968 bgcolor=#d6d6d6
| 36968 ||  || — || September 27, 2000 || Socorro || LINEAR || — || align=right | 9.0 km || 
|-id=969 bgcolor=#E9E9E9
| 36969 ||  || — || September 27, 2000 || Socorro || LINEAR || EUN || align=right | 5.0 km || 
|-id=970 bgcolor=#E9E9E9
| 36970 ||  || — || September 28, 2000 || Socorro || LINEAR || — || align=right | 3.7 km || 
|-id=971 bgcolor=#fefefe
| 36971 ||  || — || September 28, 2000 || Socorro || LINEAR || — || align=right | 2.2 km || 
|-id=972 bgcolor=#E9E9E9
| 36972 ||  || — || September 28, 2000 || Socorro || LINEAR || — || align=right | 3.5 km || 
|-id=973 bgcolor=#fefefe
| 36973 ||  || — || September 30, 2000 || Socorro || LINEAR || V || align=right | 1.8 km || 
|-id=974 bgcolor=#fefefe
| 36974 ||  || — || September 24, 2000 || Socorro || LINEAR || — || align=right | 3.6 km || 
|-id=975 bgcolor=#d6d6d6
| 36975 ||  || — || September 27, 2000 || Socorro || LINEAR || — || align=right | 3.9 km || 
|-id=976 bgcolor=#fefefe
| 36976 ||  || — || September 26, 2000 || Socorro || LINEAR || — || align=right | 4.6 km || 
|-id=977 bgcolor=#E9E9E9
| 36977 ||  || — || September 29, 2000 || Kitt Peak || Spacewatch || — || align=right | 4.0 km || 
|-id=978 bgcolor=#fefefe
| 36978 ||  || — || September 28, 2000 || Socorro || LINEAR || NYS || align=right | 2.4 km || 
|-id=979 bgcolor=#d6d6d6
| 36979 ||  || — || September 30, 2000 || Socorro || LINEAR || — || align=right | 11 km || 
|-id=980 bgcolor=#fefefe
| 36980 ||  || — || September 26, 2000 || Haleakala || NEAT || NYS || align=right | 1.6 km || 
|-id=981 bgcolor=#fefefe
| 36981 ||  || — || September 26, 2000 || Haleakala || NEAT || V || align=right | 1.9 km || 
|-id=982 bgcolor=#d6d6d6
| 36982 ||  || — || September 26, 2000 || Haleakala || NEAT || — || align=right | 4.3 km || 
|-id=983 bgcolor=#fefefe
| 36983 Sumner ||  ||  || September 21, 2000 || Kitt Peak || M. W. Buie || — || align=right | 6.5 km || 
|-id=984 bgcolor=#E9E9E9
| 36984 ||  || — || September 20, 2000 || Socorro || LINEAR || MAR || align=right | 3.0 km || 
|-id=985 bgcolor=#E9E9E9
| 36985 ||  || — || September 30, 2000 || Anderson Mesa || LONEOS || — || align=right | 2.2 km || 
|-id=986 bgcolor=#d6d6d6
| 36986 Stickle ||  ||  || September 29, 2000 || Anderson Mesa || LONEOS || JLI || align=right | 6.3 km || 
|-id=987 bgcolor=#E9E9E9
| 36987 ||  || — || September 29, 2000 || Anderson Mesa || LONEOS || — || align=right | 6.8 km || 
|-id=988 bgcolor=#d6d6d6
| 36988 ||  || — || September 30, 2000 || Anderson Mesa || LONEOS || — || align=right | 3.7 km || 
|-id=989 bgcolor=#E9E9E9
| 36989 ||  || — || September 29, 2000 || Anderson Mesa || LONEOS || GEF || align=right | 3.2 km || 
|-id=990 bgcolor=#fefefe
| 36990 ||  || — || September 27, 2000 || Socorro || LINEAR || — || align=right | 2.6 km || 
|-id=991 bgcolor=#d6d6d6
| 36991 ||  || — || September 23, 2000 || Anderson Mesa || LONEOS || — || align=right | 4.9 km || 
|-id=992 bgcolor=#E9E9E9
| 36992 ||  || — || September 23, 2000 || Anderson Mesa || LONEOS || — || align=right | 3.4 km || 
|-id=993 bgcolor=#d6d6d6
| 36993 ||  || — || September 20, 2000 || Socorro || LINEAR || — || align=right | 5.4 km || 
|-id=994 bgcolor=#E9E9E9
| 36994 ||  || — || September 25, 2000 || Anderson Mesa || LONEOS || — || align=right | 4.3 km || 
|-id=995 bgcolor=#E9E9E9
| 36995 ||  || — || October 1, 2000 || Socorro || LINEAR || — || align=right | 4.8 km || 
|-id=996 bgcolor=#E9E9E9
| 36996 ||  || — || October 1, 2000 || Socorro || LINEAR || — || align=right | 3.6 km || 
|-id=997 bgcolor=#d6d6d6
| 36997 ||  || — || October 1, 2000 || Socorro || LINEAR || — || align=right | 9.7 km || 
|-id=998 bgcolor=#d6d6d6
| 36998 ||  || — || October 1, 2000 || Socorro || LINEAR || EOS || align=right | 5.2 km || 
|-id=999 bgcolor=#E9E9E9
| 36999 ||  || — || October 4, 2000 || Haleakala || NEAT || — || align=right | 4.1 km || 
|-id=000 bgcolor=#E9E9E9
| 37000 ||  || — || October 2, 2000 || Socorro || LINEAR || — || align=right | 2.9 km || 
|}

References

External links 
 Discovery Circumstances: Numbered Minor Planets (35001)–(40000) (IAU Minor Planet Center)

0036